= First Battle of Bull Run =

1861 American Civil War battle

First Battle of Bull Run Battle of First Manassas
- Part of the American Civil War
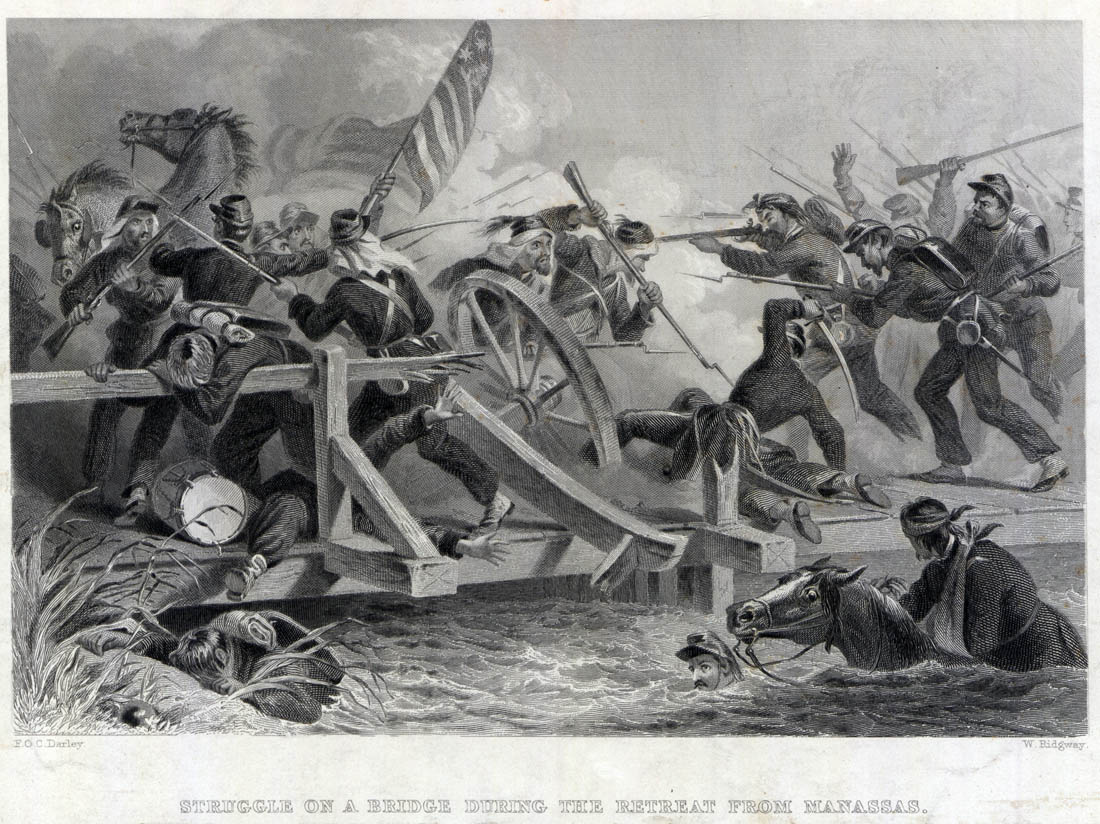
- Struggle on a Manassas, Virginia bridge during the Union army's retreat in 1861 depicted in an engraving by William Ridgway based on a drawing by F. O. C. Darley
Date	July 21, 1861
Location	Fairfax County and Prince William County, Virginia 38°48′54″N 77°31′21″W
Result	Confederate victory

Belligerents
United States	Confederate States

Commanders and leaders
Irvin McDowell	P. G. T. Beauregard; Joseph E. Johnston

Units involved
Department of Northeastern Virginia: Army of Northeastern Virginia; United States Marine Corps; Department of Pennsylvania Patterson's Command (not engaged)	Army of the Potomac; Army of the Shenandoah

Strength
Army of Northeastern Virginia: 35,732 (c. 18,000 engaged); Patterson's Command: 14,000–18,000 (not engaged)	32,000–34,000 (c. 18,000 engaged)

Casualties and losses
2,708; 481 killed 1,011 wounded 1,216 missing	1,982; 387 killed 1,582 wounded 13 missing

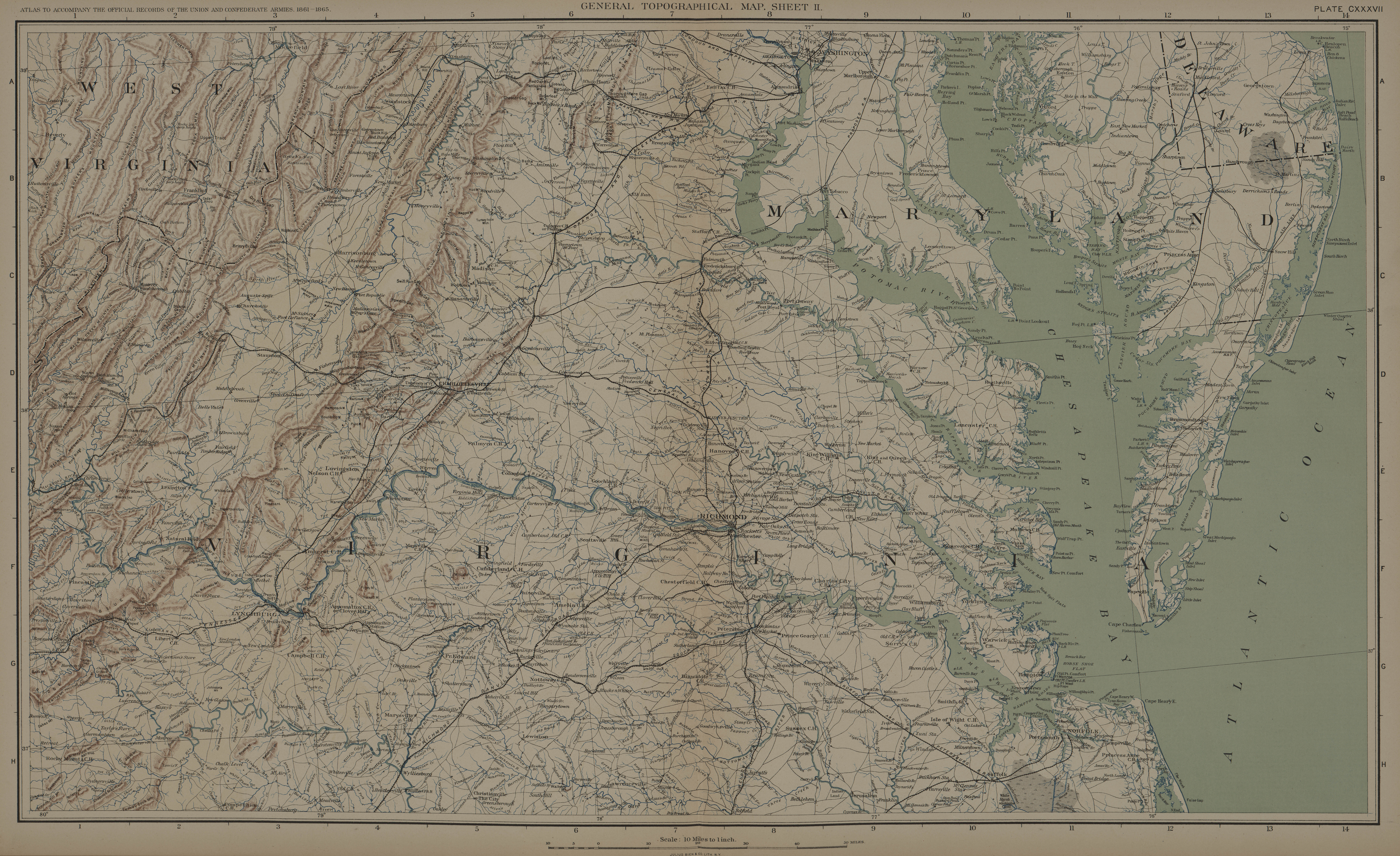
Virginia (1861)

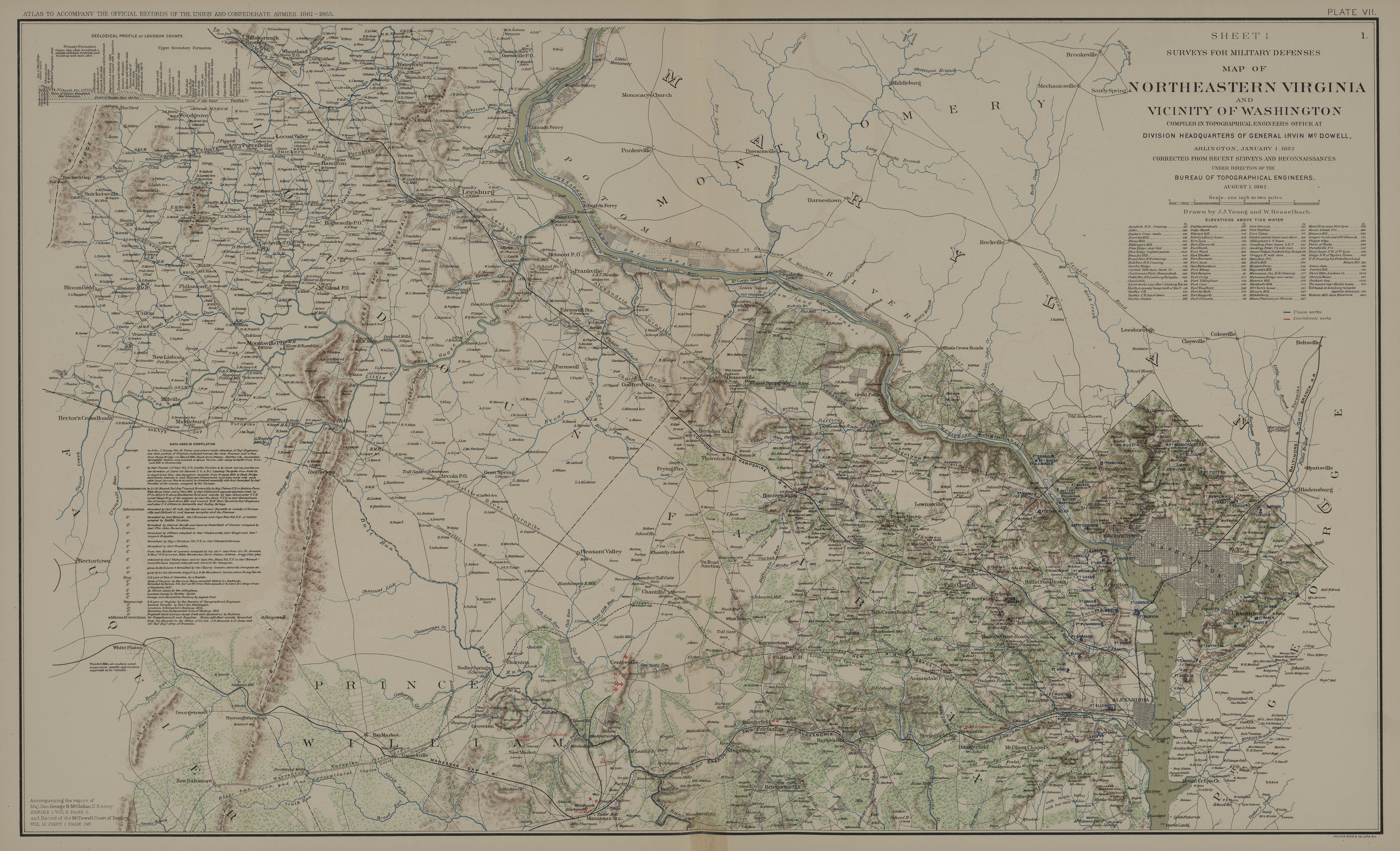
Northeastern Virginia (1861)

The First Battle of Bull Run, called the Battle of First Manassas by Confederate forces, was the first major battle of the American Civil War. The battle was fought on July 21, 1861, in Prince William County, Virginia, just north of what is now the city of Manassas and about thirty miles west-southwest of Washington, D.C. The Union army was slow in positioning itself, allowing Confederate reinforcements time to arrive by rail. Each side had about 18,000 poorly trained and poorly led troops. The battle was a Confederate victory and was followed by a disorganized post-battle retreat of the Union forces.

Just months after the start of the war at Fort Sumter, the northern public clamored for a march against the Confederate capital of Richmond, Virginia, which was expected to bring an early end to the Confederacy. Yielding to political pressure, Brigadier General Irvin McDowell led his unseasoned Union army across Bull Run against the equally inexperienced Confederate Army of Brigadier General P. G. T. Beauregard, whose forces were camped near Manassas Junction. McDowell's ambitious plan for a surprise flank attack on the Confederate left was poorly executed, although the Confederates, who had been planning to attack the Union left flank, found themselves at an initial disadvantage.

Confederate reinforcements under Brigadier General Joseph E. Johnston arrived from the Shenandoah Valley by railroad, and the course of the battle quickly changed. A brigade of Virginians under a relatively unknown brigadier general from the Virginia Military Institute, Thomas J. Jackson, stood its ground, which resulted in Jackson receiving his famous nickname, "Stonewall". The Confederates launched a strong counterattack, and as the Union troops began withdrawing under fire, many panicked and the retreat turned into a rout. McDowell's men frantically ran without order in the direction of Washington, D.C.

Both armies were sobered by the fierce fighting and the many casualties and realized that the war was going to be much longer and bloodier than either had anticipated. The First Battle of Bull Run highlighted many of the problems and deficiencies that were typical of the first year of the war. Units were committed piecemeal, attacks were frontal, infantry failed to protect exposed artillery, tactical intelligence was minimal, and neither commander was able to employ his whole force effectively. McDowell, with 35,000 men, could commit only about 18,000, and the combined Confederate forces, with about 32,000 men, also committed 18,000.

== Background ==
=== Military and political situation ===
Opposing political leaders
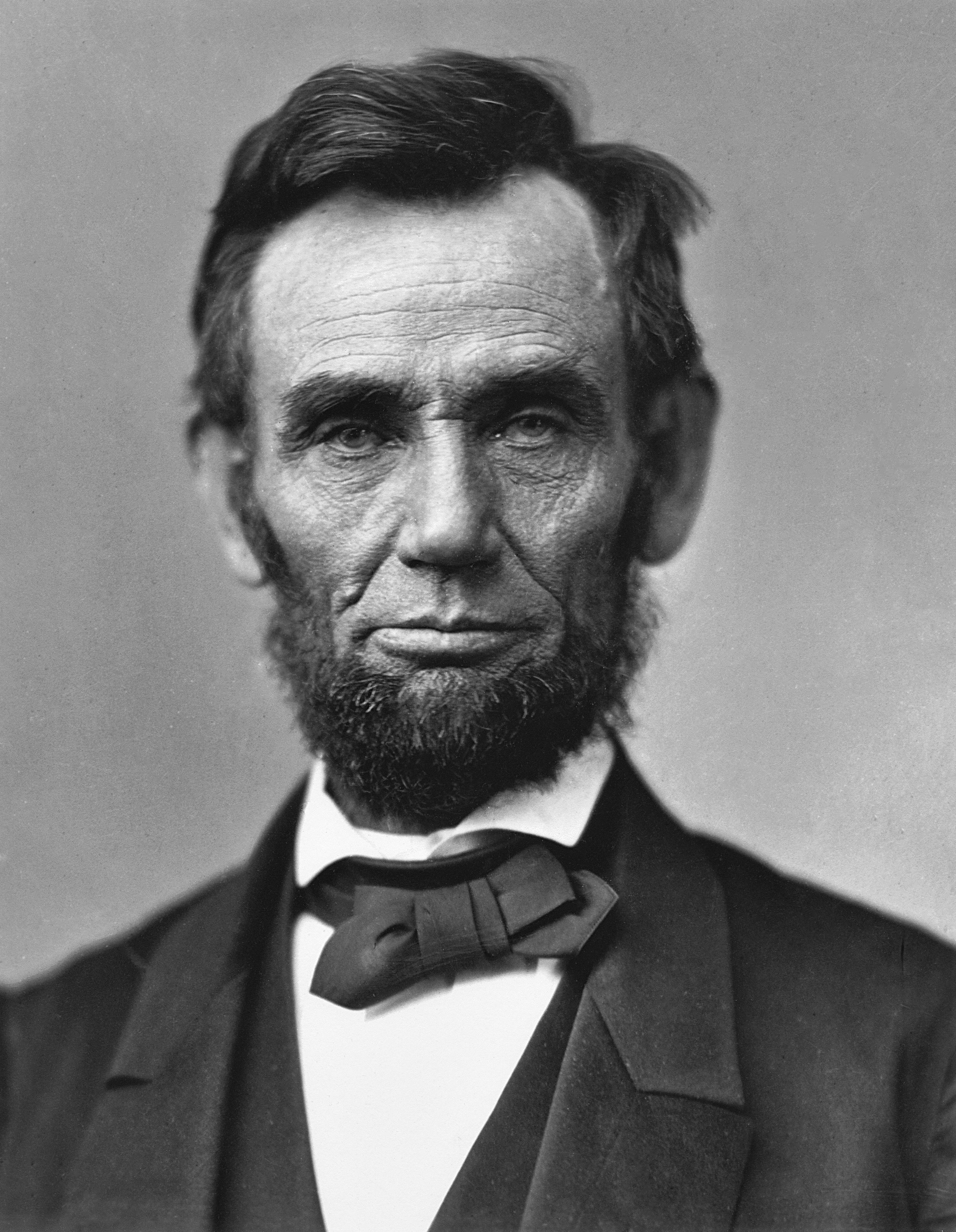
Pres.
Abraham Lincoln,
USA

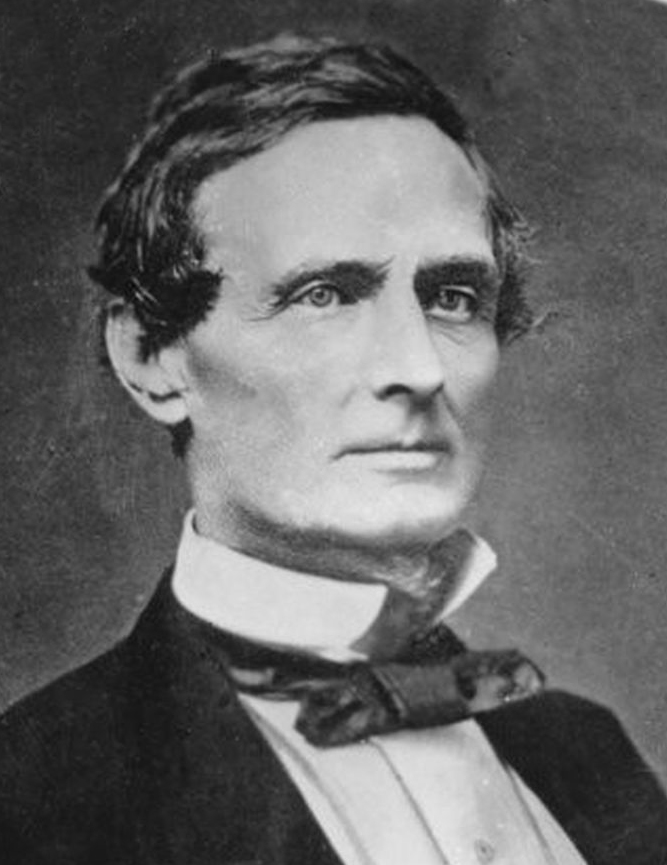
Pres.
Jefferson Davis,
CSA

On December 20, 1860, South Carolina was the first of seven Southern States to declare secession from the Union of the United States. By February 1, 1861, Mississippi, Florida, Alabama, Georgia, Louisiana, and Texas passed ordinances of secession. The Constitution of the Confederate States of America was adopted in Montgomery, Alabama on February 8, 1861. On March 1, 1861, Confederate States Army forces assumed control of the military situation at Charleston, South Carolina from state forces.

Open warfare between the Confederate States and the United States began when Confederate forces barraged Fort Sumter in Charleston Harbor on April 12, 1861. Sumter had been occupied by the United States Army since December 26, 1860. On April 15, 1861 (two days after the Federal Army forces surrendered at Fort Sumter, one day after the formal surrender), President Abraham Lincoln issued a proclamation declaring an insurrection against the laws of the United States had taken place.

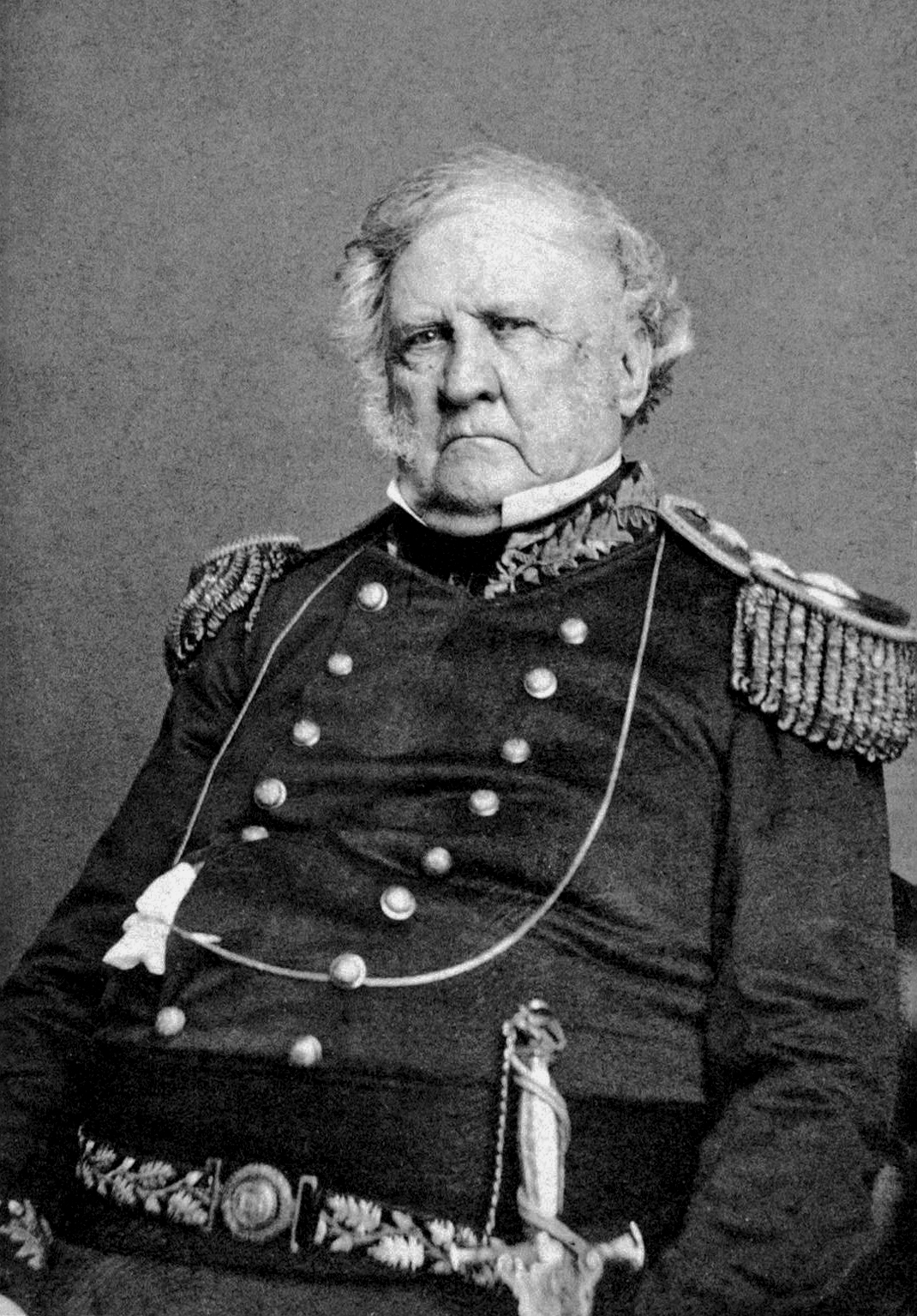
Lt. Gen. Winfield Scott, General in Chief, USA

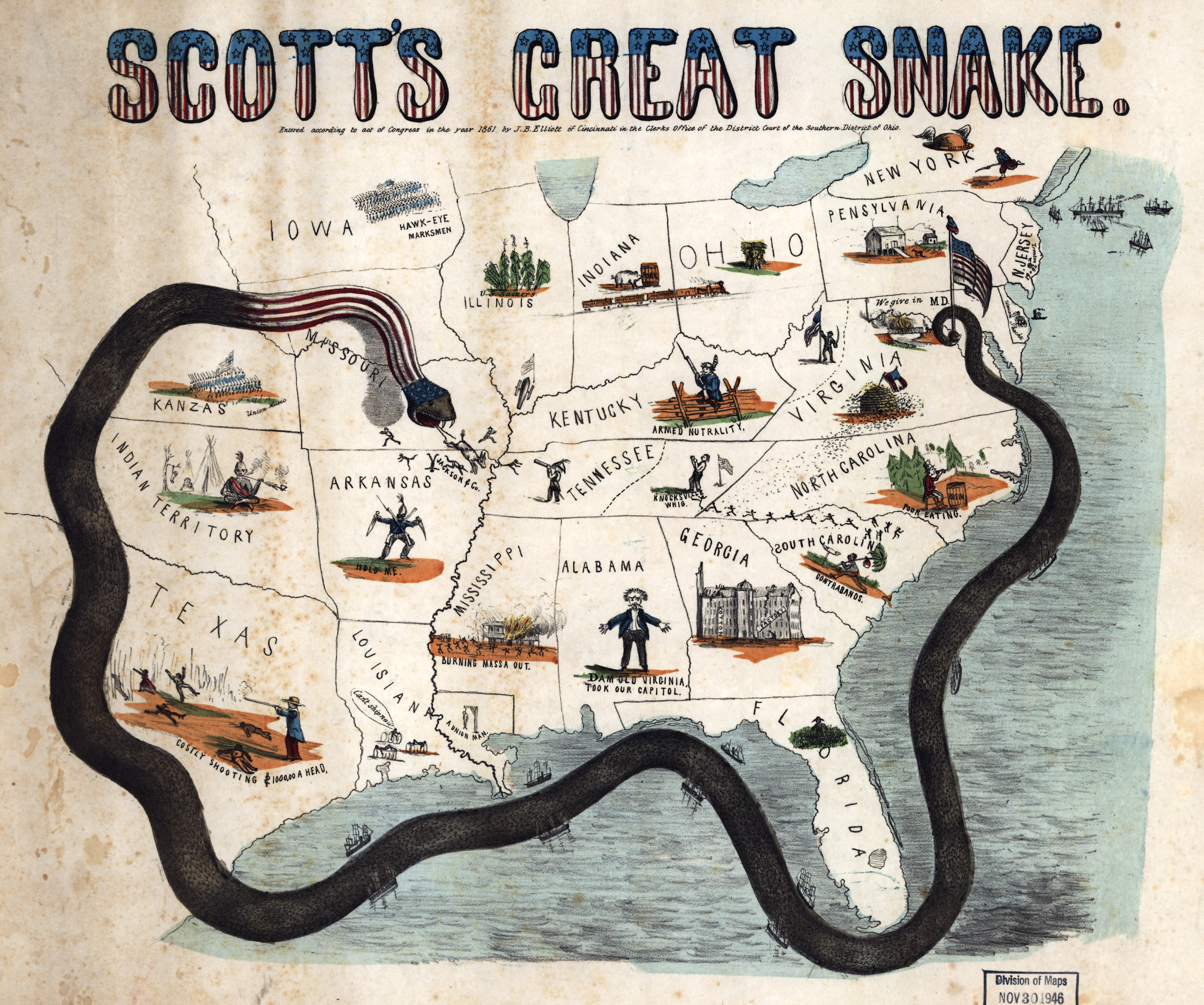
Cartoon map illustrating Gen. Winfield Scott's plan to crush the Confederacy economically. It is often called the "Anaconda Plan".

To suppress the insurrection of the Confederate States and restore federal law in the Southern States, Lincoln called for 75,000 volunteers with ninety-day enlistments to augment the existing U.S. Army of about 15,000 present for duty. He later accepted an additional 40,000 volunteers with three-year enlistments and increased the strength of the U.S. Army to 156,861, further enlarged to 183,588 present for duty on July 1. Lincoln's actions caused four more Southern states, including Virginia, Arkansas, North Carolina and Tennessee, to adopt ordinances of secession and join the Confederate States of America. On May 29, 1861, with the arrival of Confederate President Jefferson Davis in Richmond, Virginia, the Confederate States capital had been moved from Montgomery to Richmond.

In Washington, D.C., many of the regiments of volunteers raised by States under Lincoln's call rushed to defend the capital. General in Chief Lt. Gen. Winfield Scott laid out his strategy to subdue the Confederate States on May 3, 1861. He proposed that an army of 80,000 men be organized to sail down the Mississippi River and capture New Orleans. While the Army "strangled" the Confederacy in the west, the U.S. Navy would blockade Southern ports along the eastern and Gulf coasts. The press ridiculed what they dubbed as Scott's "Anaconda Plan". Instead, many believed the capture of the Confederate capital at Richmond, only 100 miles (160 km) south of Washington, would quickly end the war. By July 1861, many of the thousands of Union volunteers were camped in and around Washington. Since General Scott was seventy-five years old and physically unable to lead this force against the Confederates, the administration searched for a more suitable field commander.

=== Irvin McDowell ===
Secretary of the Treasury Salmon P. Chase championed fellow Ohioan, 42-year-old Maj. Irvin McDowell. Although McDowell was a West Point graduate, his command experience was limited. In fact, he had spent most of his career engaged in various staff duties in the Adjutant General's Office. While stationed in Washington he had become acquainted with Chase, a former Ohio governor and senator. Now, through Chase's influence, McDowell was promoted three grades to brigadier general in the Regular Army and on 27 May was assigned command (by President Abraham Lincoln) of the Department of Northeastern Virginia, which included the military forces in and around Washington. McDowell immediately began organizing what became known as the Army of Northeastern Virginia, 35,000 men arranged in five divisions. Under public and political pressure to begin offensive operations, McDowell was given very little time to train the newly inducted troops. Units were instructed in the maneuvering of regiments, but they received little or no training at the brigade or division level. He was reassured by President Lincoln, "You are green, it is true, but they are green also; you are all green alike." Against his better judgment, McDowell commenced campaigning.

=== Intelligence ===
During the previous year, U.S. Army captain Thomas Jordan set up a pro-Southern spy network in Washington, D.C., recruiting Rose O'Neal Greenhow, a prominent socialite with a wide range of contacts. He provided her with a code for messages. After he left to join the Confederate Army, he gave her control of his network but continued to receive reports from her. On July 9 and 16, Greenhow passed secret messages to Confederate General P.G.T. Beauregard containing critical information regarding military movements for what would be the First Battle of Bull Run, including the plans of Union general McDowell.

=== McDowell's plan and initial movements in the Manassas campaign ===
On July 16, McDowell departed Washington with the largest field army yet gathered on the North American continent, about 35,000 men (28,452 effectives). McDowell's plan was to move westward in three columns and make a diversionary attack on the Confederate line at Bull Run with two columns, while the third column moved around the Confederates' right flank to the south, cutting the railroad to Richmond and threatening the rear of the Confederate army. He assumed that the Confederates would be forced to abandon Manassas Junction and fall back to the Rappahannock River, the next defensible line in Virginia, which would relieve some of the pressure on the U.S. capital. McDowell had hoped to have his army at Centreville by 17 July, but the troops, unaccustomed to marching, moved in starts and stops. Along the route soldiers often broke ranks to wander off to pick apples or blackberries or to get water, regardless of the orders of their officers to remain in ranks.

The Confederate Army of the Potomac (21,883 effectives) under Beauregard was encamped near Manassas Junction where he prepared a defensive position along the south bank of the Bull Run river with his left guarding a stone bridge, approximately 25 miles (40 km) from the United States capital. McDowell planned to attack this numerically inferior enemy army. Union Maj. Gen. Robert Patterson's 18,000 men engaged Johnston's force (the Army of the Shenandoah at 8,884 effectives, augmented by Maj. Gen. Theophilus H. Holmes's brigade of 1,465) in the Shenandoah Valley, preventing them from reinforcing Beauregard.

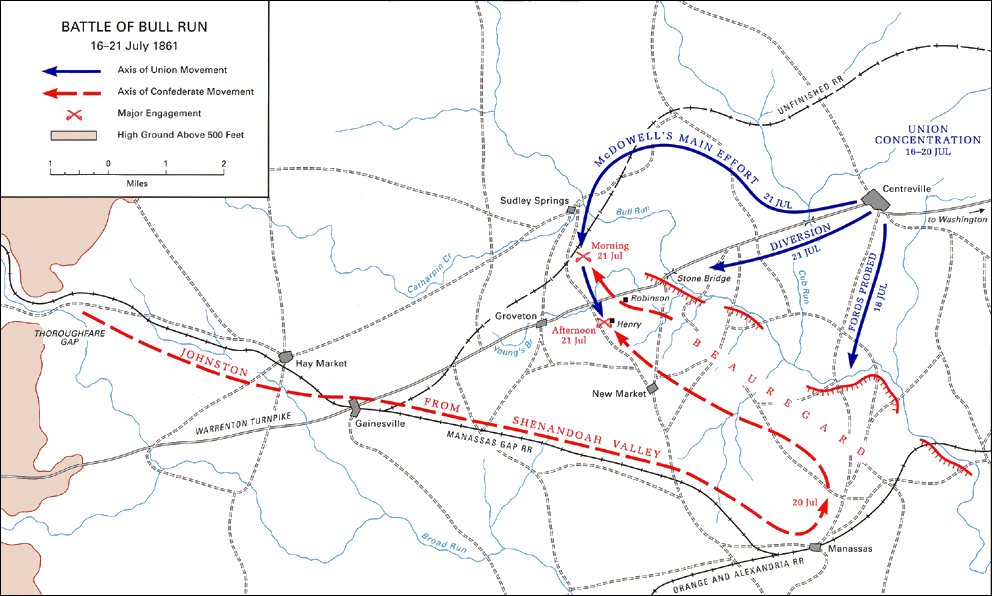
Movements July 16–21, 1861

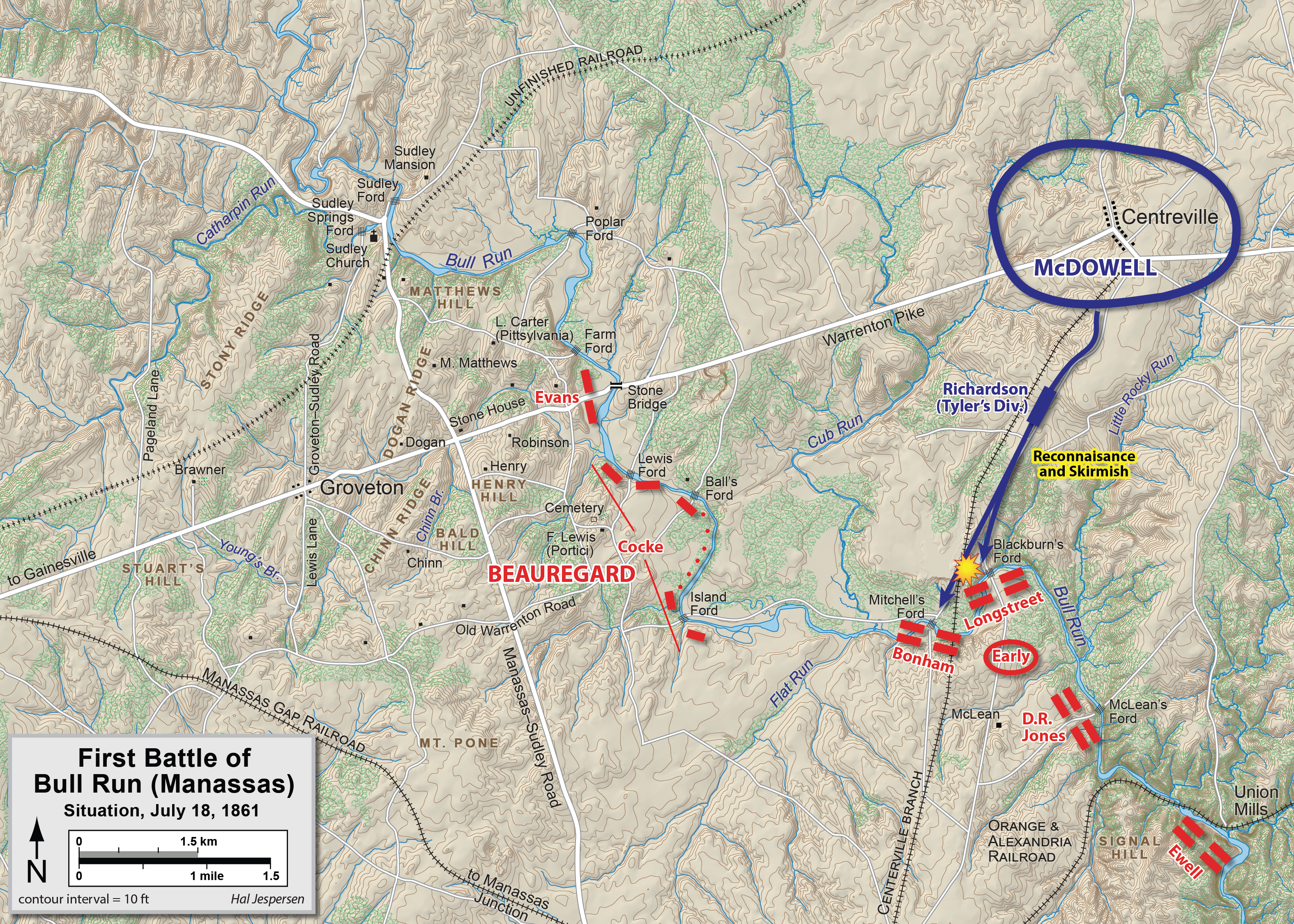
Situation July 18

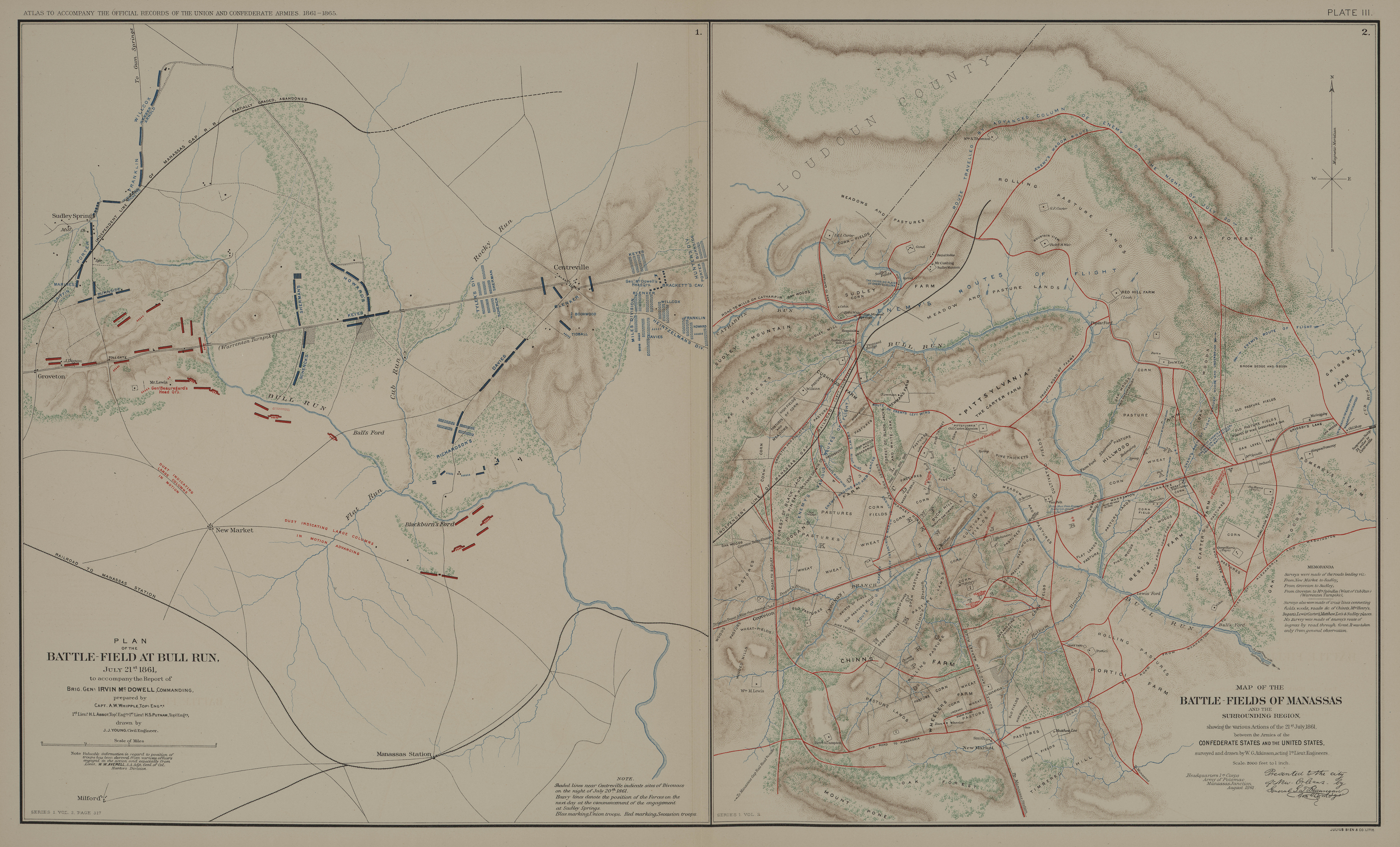
Battlefield of Manassas

After two days of marching slowly in the sweltering heat, the Union army was allowed to rest in Centreville. McDowell reduced the size of his army to approximately 31,000 by dispatching Brig. Gen. Theodore Runyon with 5,000 troops to protect the army's rear. In the meantime, McDowell searched for a way to outflank Beauregard, who had drawn up his lines along Bull Run. On July 18, the Union commander sent a division under Brig. Gen. Daniel Tyler to pass on the Confederate right (southeast) flank. Tyler was drawn into a skirmish at Blackburn's Ford over Bull Run and made no headway. Also on the morning of 18 July Johnston had received a telegram suggesting he go to Beauregard's assistance if possible. Johnston marched out of Winchester about noon, while Stuart's cavalry screened the movement from Patterson. Patterson was completely deceived. One hour after Johnston's departure Patterson telegraphed Washington, "I have succeeded, in accordance with the wishes of the General-in-Chief, in keeping General Johnston's force at Winchester."

For the maneuver to be successful McDowell felt he needed to act quickly. He had already begun to hear rumors that Johnston had slipped out of the valley and was headed for Manassas Junction. If the rumors were true, McDowell might soon be facing 34,000 Confederates instead of 22,000. Another reason for quick action was McDowell's concern that the ninety-day enlistments of many of his regiments were about to expire. "In a few days I will lose many thousands of the best of this force", he wrote Washington on the eve of battle. In fact, the next morning two units of McDowell's command, their enlistments expiring that day, would turn a deaf ear to McDowell's appeal to stay a few days longer. Instead, to the sounds of battle, they would march back to Washington to be mustered out of service.

Becoming more frustrated, McDowell resolved to attack the Confederate left (northwest) flank instead. He planned to attack with Brig. Gen. Daniel Tyler's division at the Stone Bridge on the Warrenton Turnpike and send the divisions of Brig. Gens. David Hunter and Samuel P. Heintzelman over Sudley Springs Ford. From here, these divisions could outflank the Confederate line and march into the Confederate rear. The brigade of Col. Israel B. Richardson (Tyler's Division) would harass the enemy at Blackburn's Ford, preventing them from thwarting the main attack. Patterson would tie down Johnston in the Shenandoah Valley so that reinforcements could not reach the area. Although McDowell had arrived at a theoretically sound plan, it had a number of flaws: it was one that required synchronized execution of troop movements and attacks, skills that had not been developed in the nascent army; it relied on actions by Patterson that he had already failed to take; finally, McDowell had delayed long enough that Johnston's Valley force, which had trained under Stonewall Jackson, was able to board trains at Piedmont Station and rush to Manassas Junction to reinforce Beauregard's men.

=== Prelude to battle ===
On July 19–20, significant reinforcements bolstered the Confederate lines behind Bull Run. Johnston arrived with all of his army except for the troops of Brig. Gen. Kirby Smith, who were still in transit. Most of the new arrivals were posted in the vicinity of Blackburn's Ford, and Beauregard's plan was to attack from there to the north toward Centreville. Johnston, the senior officer, approved the plan. If both of the armies had been able to execute their plans simultaneously, it would have resulted in a mutual counterclockwise movement as they attacked each other's left flank.

McDowell was getting contradictory information from his intelligence agents, so he called for the balloon Enterprise, which was being demonstrated by Prof. Thaddeus S. C. Lowe in Washington, to perform aerial reconnaissance.

== Opposing forces ==
=== Union ===
Key Union Generals
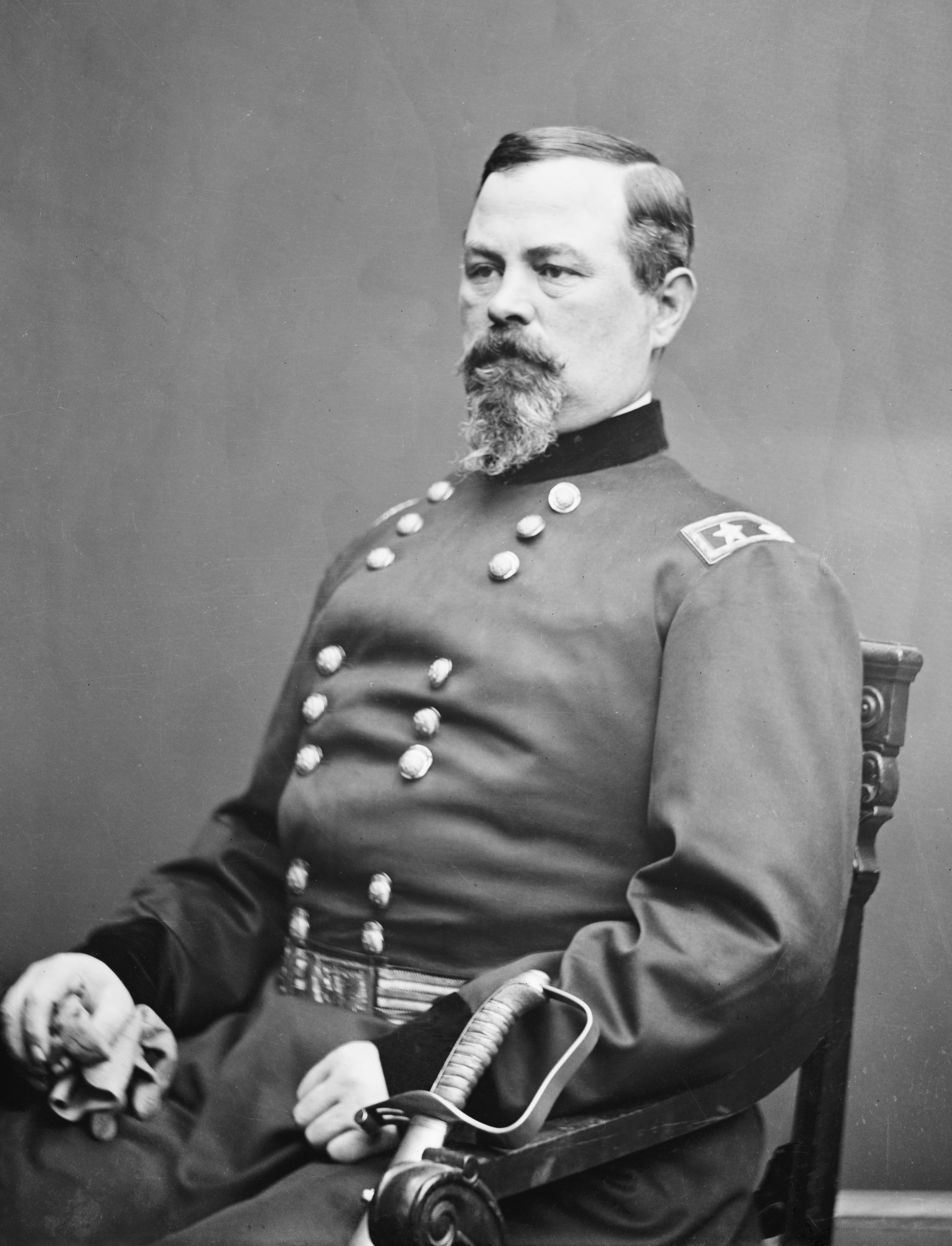
Brig. Gen.
Irvin McDowell, (Commanding)

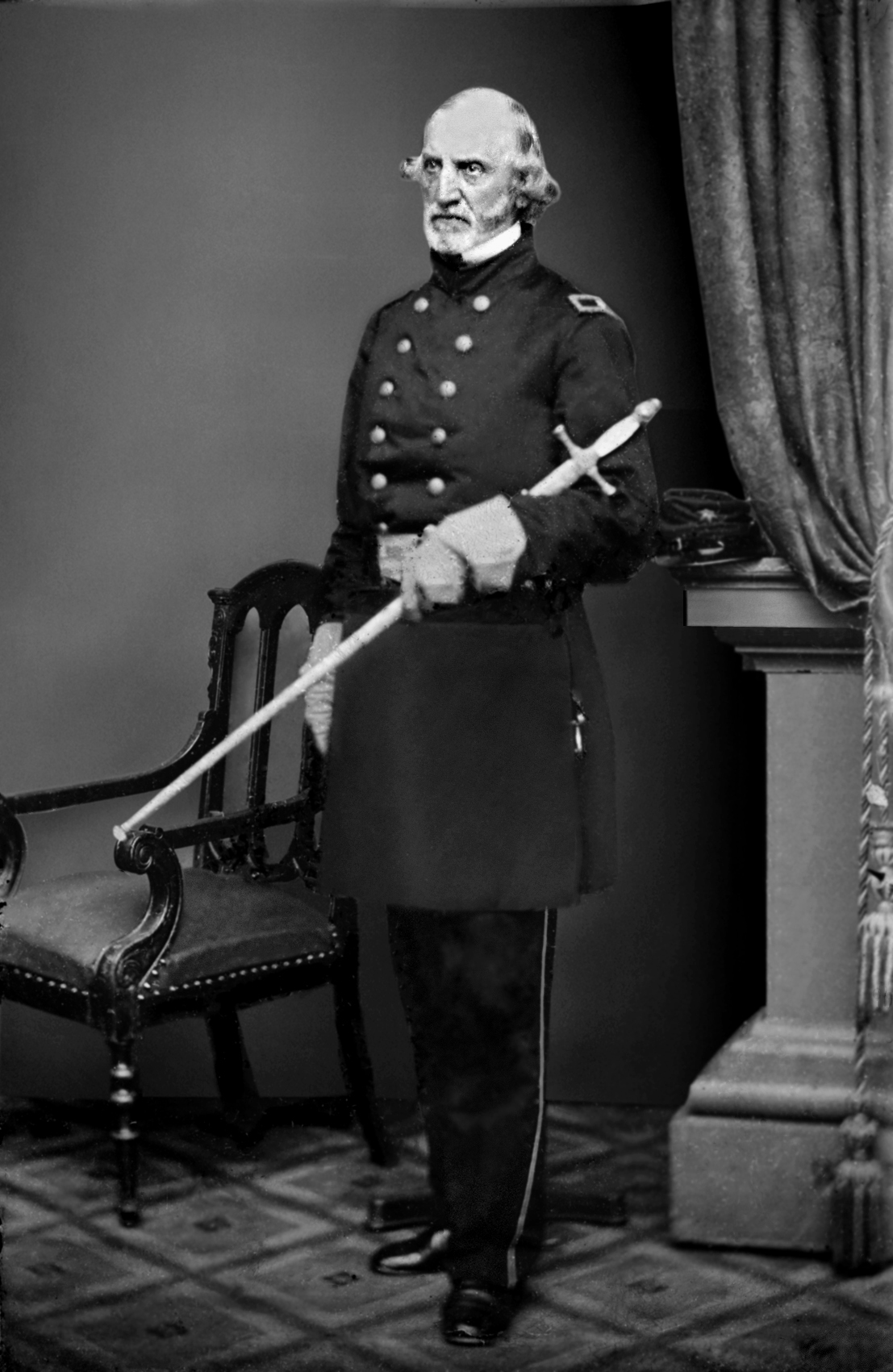
Brig. Gen.
Daniel Tyler

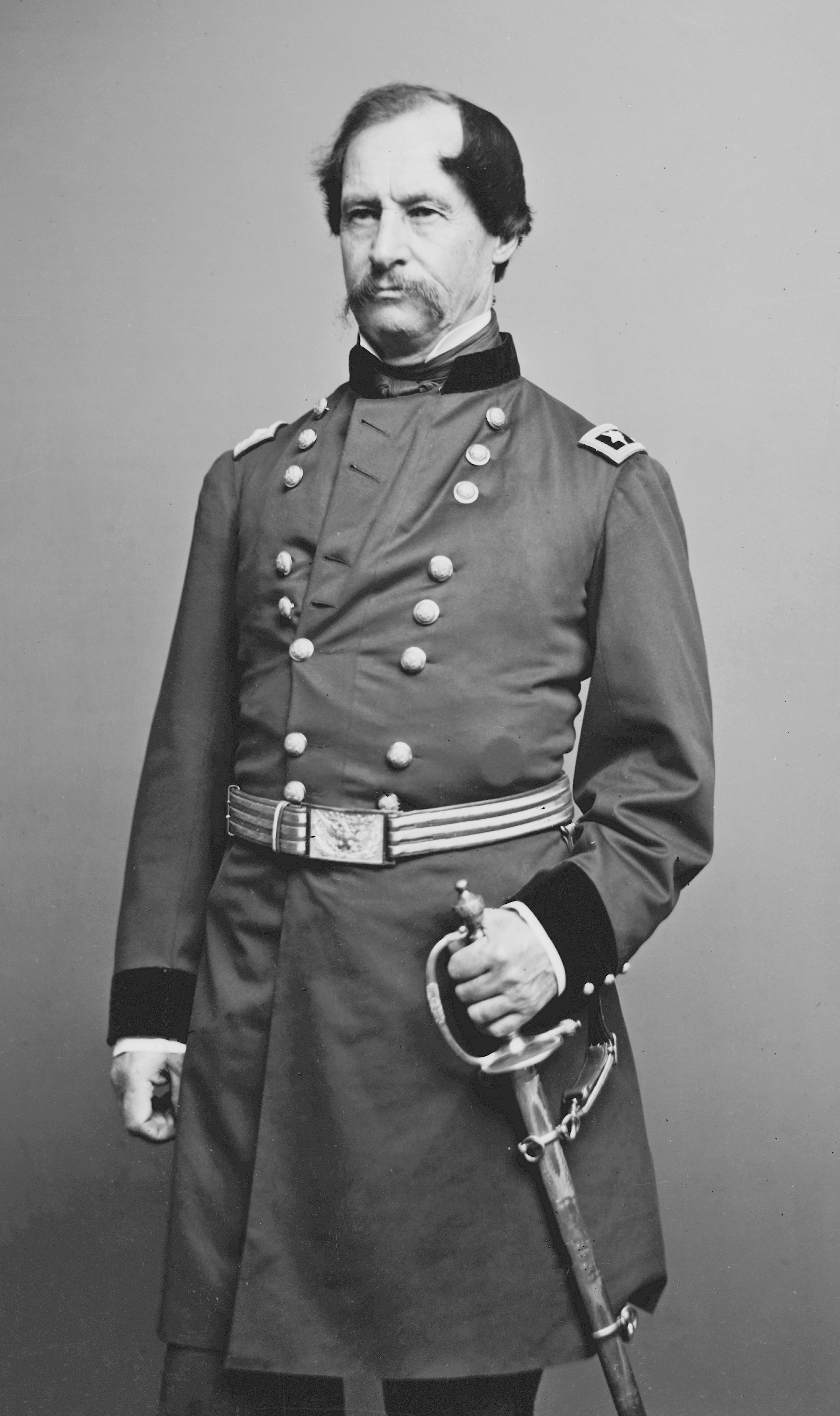
Brig. Gen.
David Hunter

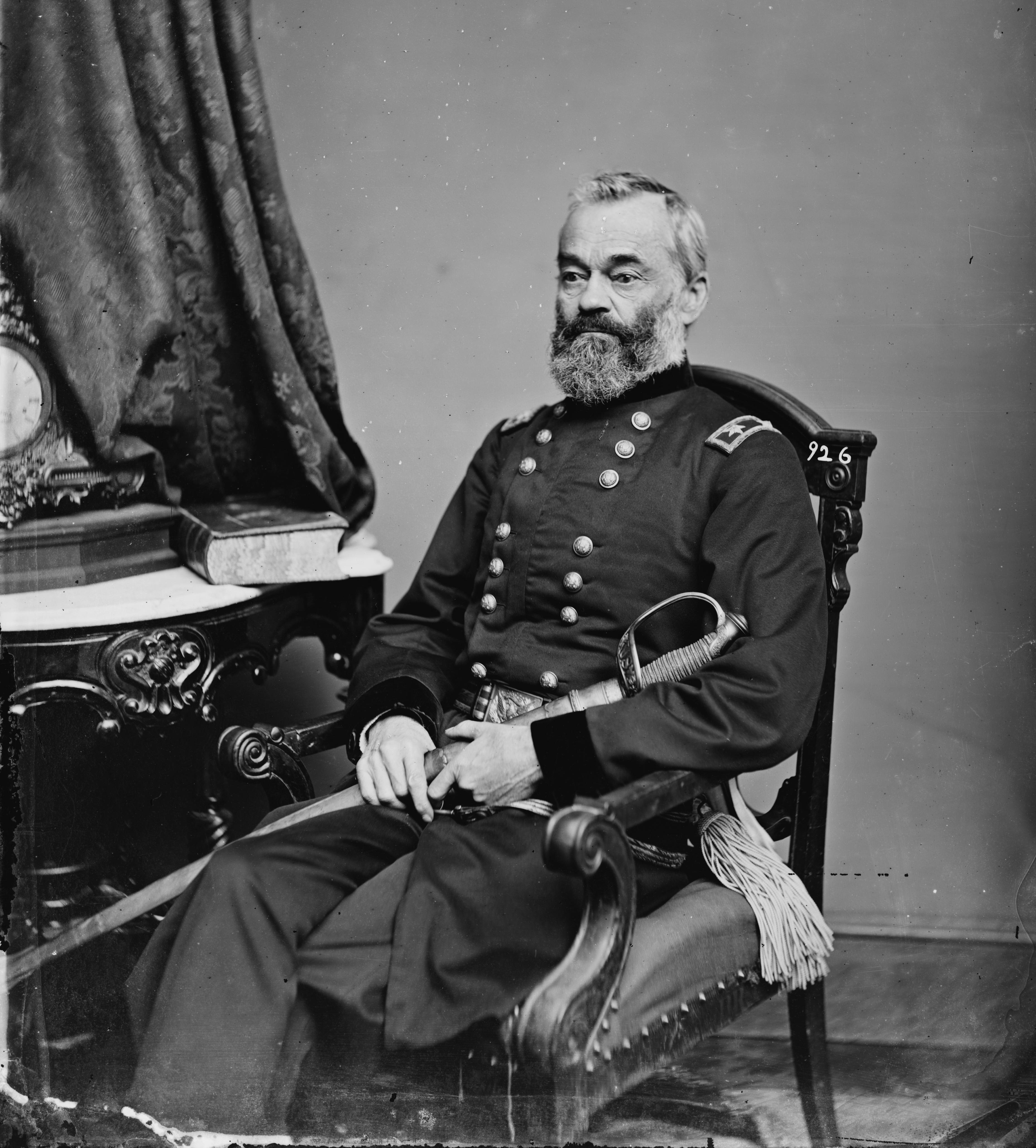
Brig. Gen.
Samuel P. Heintzelman
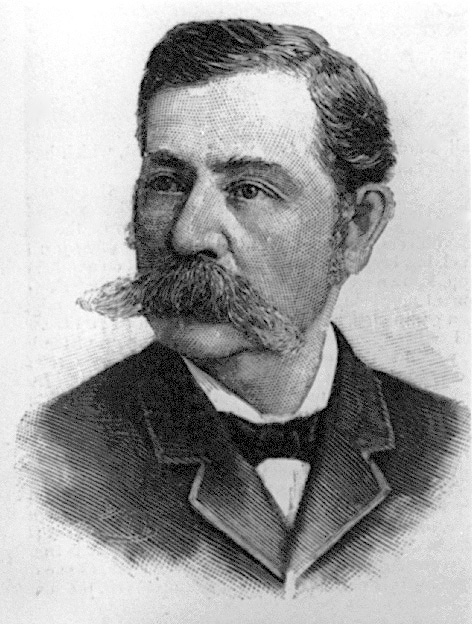
Brig. Gen.
Theodore Runyon

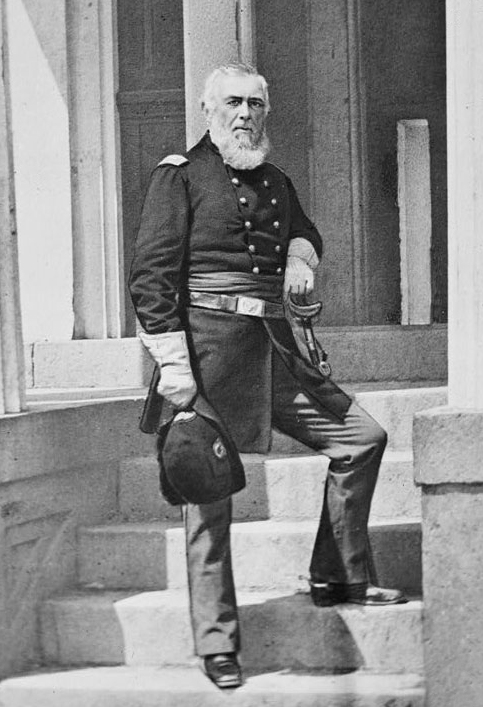
Col.
Dixon S. Miles

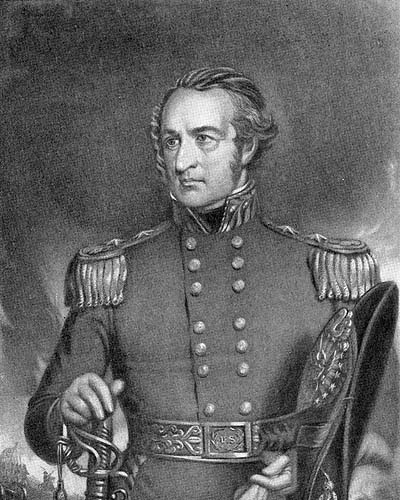
Maj. Gen.
Robert Patterson

McDowell's Army of Northeastern Virginia was organized into five infantry divisions of three to five brigades each. Each brigade contained three to five infantry regiments. An artillery battery was generally assigned to each brigade. The total number of Union troops present at the First Battle of Bull Run was about 35,000 although only about 18,000 were actually engaged. The Union army was organized as follows:

- 1st Division of Brig. Gen. Daniel Tyler the largest in the army, contained four brigades, led by Brig. Gen. Robert C. Schenck, Col. Erasmus D. Keyes, Col. William T. Sherman, and Col. Israel B. Richardson;
- 2nd Division of Col. David Hunter of two brigades. These were led by Cols. Andrew Porter and Ambrose E. Burnside;
- 3rd Division of Col. Samuel P. Heintzelman included three brigades, led by Cols. William B. Franklin, Orlando B. Willcox, and Oliver O. Howard;
- 4th Division of Brig. Gen. Theodore Runyon without brigade organization and not engaged, contained seven regiments of New Jersey and one regiment of New York volunteer infantries;
- 5th Division of Col. Dixon S. Miles included two brigades, commanded by Cols. Louis Blenker and Thomas A. Davies;

While McDowell organized the Army of Northeastern Virginia, a smaller Union command was organized and stationed northwest of Washington, near Harper's Ferry. Commanded by Maj. Gen. Robert Patterson, 18,000 men of the Department of Pennsylvania protected against a Confederate incursion from the Shenandoah Valley.

Abstract from the returns of the Department of Northeastern Virginia, commanded by Brigadier-General McDowell, U.S.A., for July 16 and 17, 1861.

ARMY OF NORTHEASTERN VIRGINIA
Commands	Present			
Commands	For duty		Total	Aggregate
Commands	Officers	Men	Total	Aggregate
General staff	19			21
First (Tyler's) Division	569	12,226	9,494	9,936
Second (Hunter's) Division	121	2,364	2,525	2,648
Third (Heintzelman's) Division	382	8,680	9,385	9,777
Fourth (Runyon's) Division	247	5,201	5,502	5,752
Fifth (Miles') Division	289	5,884	5,917	6,207
Twenty-first New York Volunteers	37	684	707	745
Twenty-fifth New York Militia	39	519	534	573
Second United States Cavalry, Company E	4	56	63	73
Total	1,707	35,614	34,127	35,732

Abstract from return of the Department of Pennsylvania, commanded by Major-General Patterson, June 28, 1861.

PATTERSON'S COMMAND
Commanding officer	Troops	Present for duty					
Commanding officer	Troops	Infantry		Cavalry		Artillery	
Commanding officer	Troops	Officers	Men	Officers	Men	Officers	Men
Bvt. Maj. Gen. George Cadwalader	First division	322	6,637	11	307	7	251
Maj. Gen. William H. Keim	Second division	322	6,410	3	74		
	Total	644	13,047	14	381	7	251

Aggregate present for duty
Infantry	13,691
Cavalry	395
Artillery	258
Total	14,344

=== Confederate ===
Key Confederate Generals
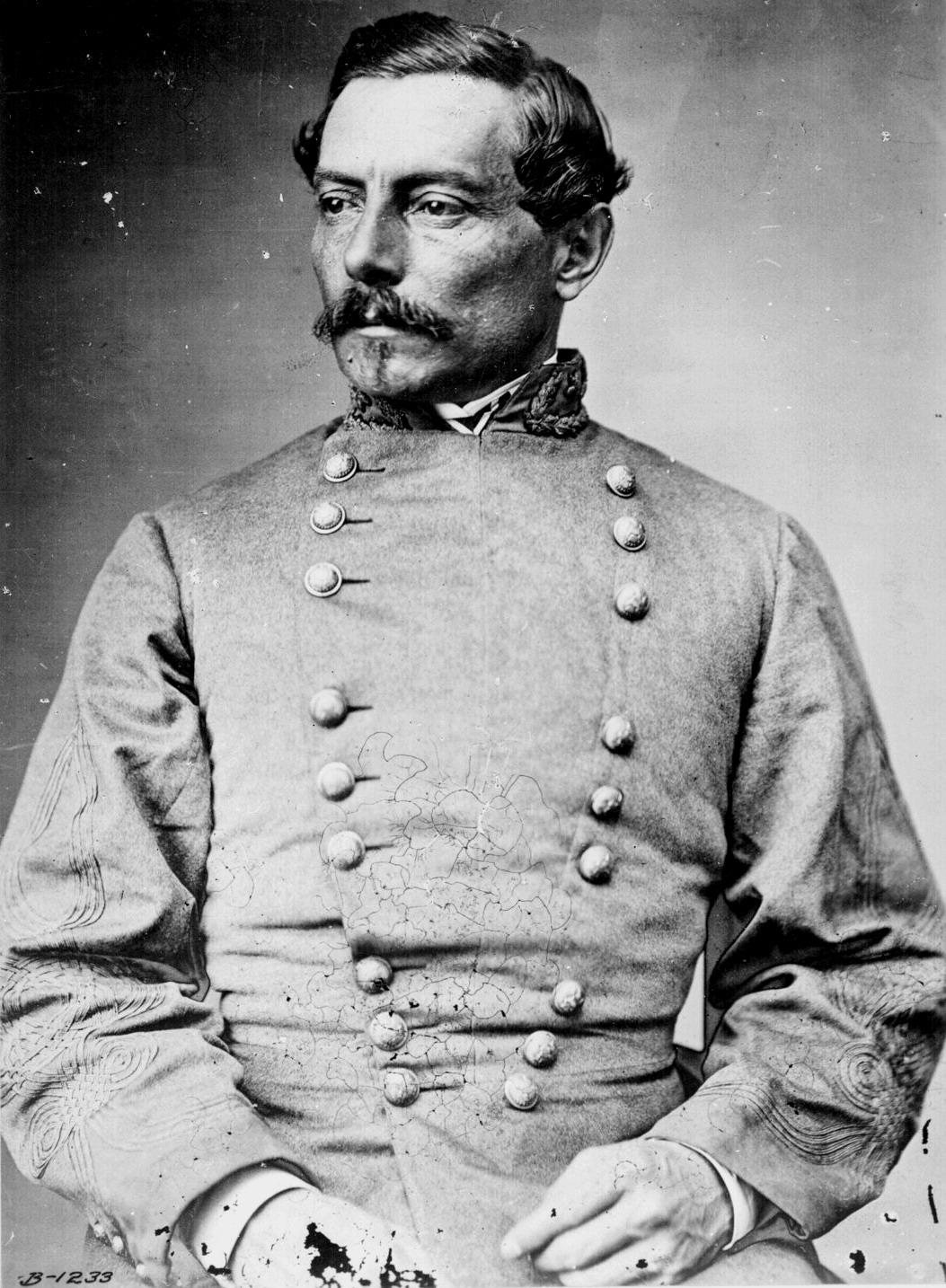
Brig. Gen.
P. G. T. Beauregard, Army of the Potomac

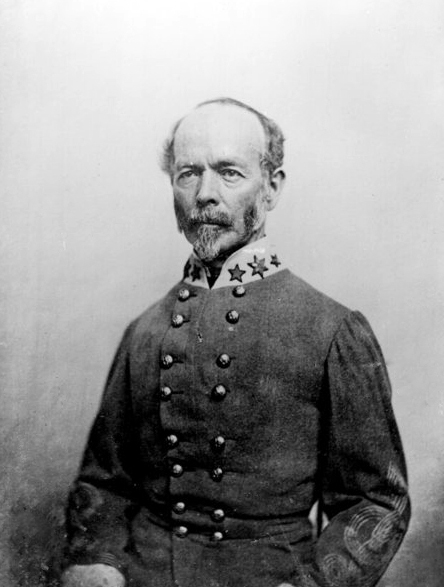
Brig. Gen.
Joseph E. Johnston, Army of the Shenandoah

- The Army of the Potomac (Brig. Gen. P. G. T. Beauregard, commanding) was organized into six infantry brigades, with each brigade containing three to six infantry regiments. Artillery batteries were assigned to various infantry brigades. The total number of troops in the Confederate Army of the Potomac was approximately 22,000. Beauregard's army also contained thirty-nine pieces of field artillery and a regiment of Virginia cavalry. The Army of the Potomac was organized into seven infantry brigades. These were:
  - 1st Brigade, under Brig. Gen. Milledge Luke Bonham;
  - 2nd Brigade, under Brig. Gen. Richard S. Ewell;
  - 3rd Brigade, under Brig. Gen. David R. Jones;
  - 4th Brigade, under Brig. Gen. James Longstreet;
  - 5th Brigade, under Col. Philip St. George Cocke;
  - 6th Brigade, under Col. Jubal Early;
  - 7th Brigade, under Col. Nathan G. Evans.
  - Reserve Brigade, under Brig. Gen. Theophilus H. Holmes
- The Army of the Shenandoah (Brig. Gen. Joseph E. Johnston, commanding) was also organized into brigades. It consisted of four brigades of three to five infantry regiments each, which totaled approximately 12,000 men. Each brigade was assigned one artillery battery. In addition to the infantry, there were twenty pieces of artillery and about 300 Virginia cavalrymen under Col. J. E. B. Stuart. Although the combined strength of both Confederate armies was about 34,000, only about 18,000 were actually engaged at the First Battle of Bull Run. The Army of the Shenandoah consisted of four infantry brigades:
  - 1st Brigade, commanded by Brig. Gen. Thomas J. Jackson;
  - 2nd Brigade, commanded by Col. Francis S. Bartow;
  - 3rd Brigade, commanded by Brig. Gen. Barnard E. Bee;
  - 4th Brigade, commanded by Brig. Gen. Edmund Kirby Smith.

Abstract front field return, First Corps (Army of the Potomac), July 21, 1861.

[Dated September 25, 1861.]

ARMY OF THE POTOMAC
Commands	General and Staff Officers	Infantry		Cavalry		Artillery	
Commands	General and Staff Officers	Officers	Men	Officers	Men	Officers	Men
First Brigade	4	211	4,070				
Second Brigade	4	133	2,307				
Third Brigade	4	128	1,989				
Fourth Brigade	4	160	2,364				
Fifth Brigade	3	208	3,065				
Sixth Brigade	3	261	2,356				
Seventh Louisiana		44	773				
Eighth Louisiana		43	803				
Hampton's Legion		27	627				
Thirteenth Virginia				34	642		
Harrison's Battalion (three companies)				13	196		
Troops (ten) of cavalry				38	545		
Washington (Louisiana) Artillery						19	201
Kemper's battery						4	76
Latham's battery						4	86
Loudoun Battery						3	55
Shield's battery						3	82
Camp Pickens (heavy artillery)						18	275
Total	22	1,215	18,354	85	1,383	51	775

Aggregates:	
Infantry	19,569
Cavalry	1,468
Artillery	826
	21,863

Abstract from monthly report of Brig. Gen. Joseph E. Johnston's division, or Army of the Shenandoah (C.S.A.), for June 30, 1861.

ARMY OF THE SHENANDOAH
Commanding officer	Troops	PRESENT FOR DUTY					
Commanding officer	Troops	Infantry		Cavalry		Artillery	
Commanding officer	Troops	Officers	Men	Officers	Men	Officers	Men
Colonel Jackson	First brigade	128	2,043			4	81
Col. F. S. Bartow	Second brigade	155	2,391			3	59
Brigadier-General Bee	Third brigade	161	2,629			4	78
Col. A. Elzey	Fourth brigade	156	2,106			4	45
Col. J. E. B. Stuart	First Virginia Cavalry			21	313		
Col. A. C. Cummings	Virginia Volunteers	14	227				
	Total	614	9,396	21	313	15	263

Aggregate present for duty.

General staff	32
Infantry	10,010
Cavalry	334
Artillery	278
	10,654

== Battle ==
=== Morning phase ===
==== Matthews Hill ====
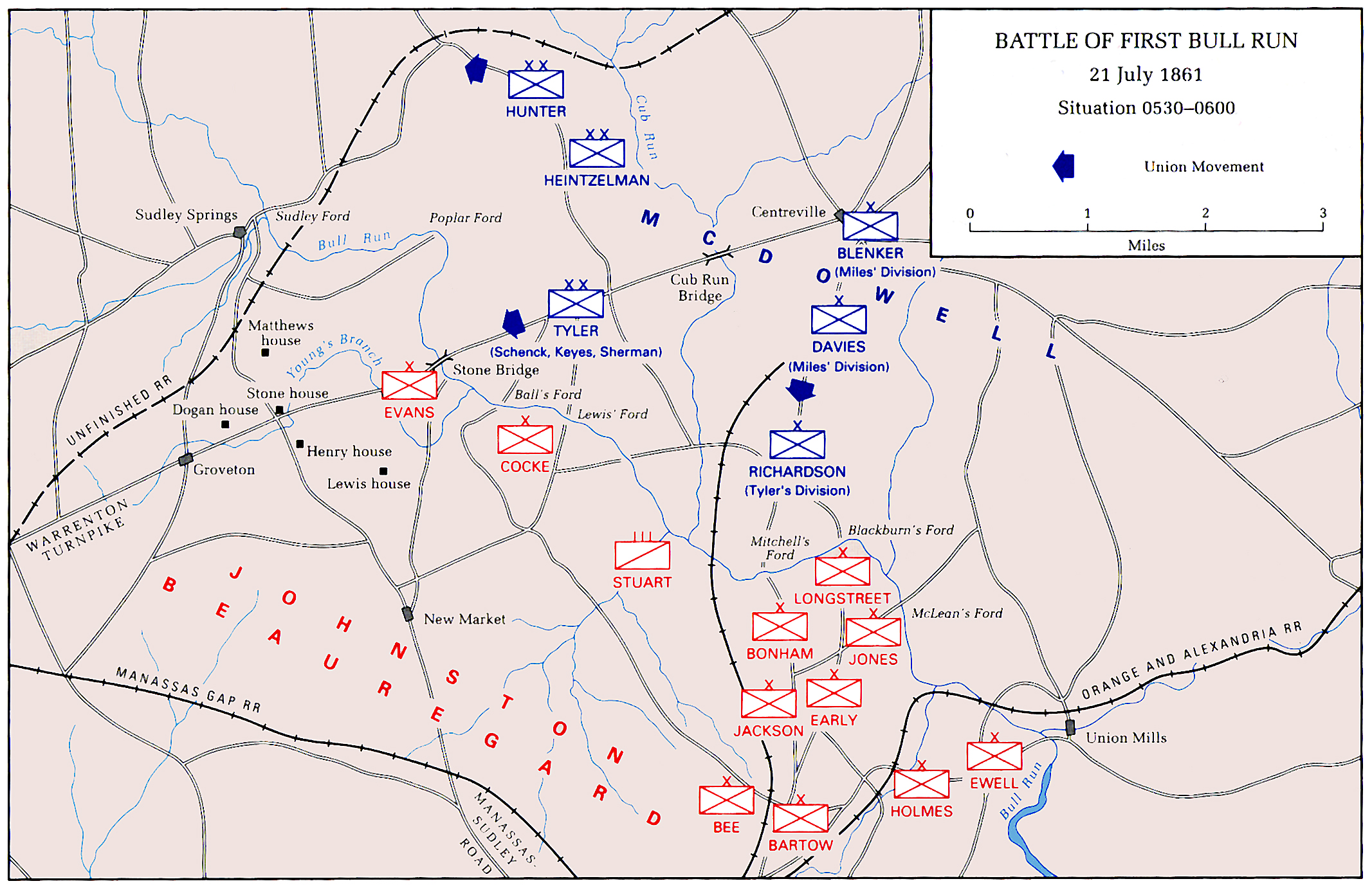
Situation at 05:30–06:00 (July 21, 1861)

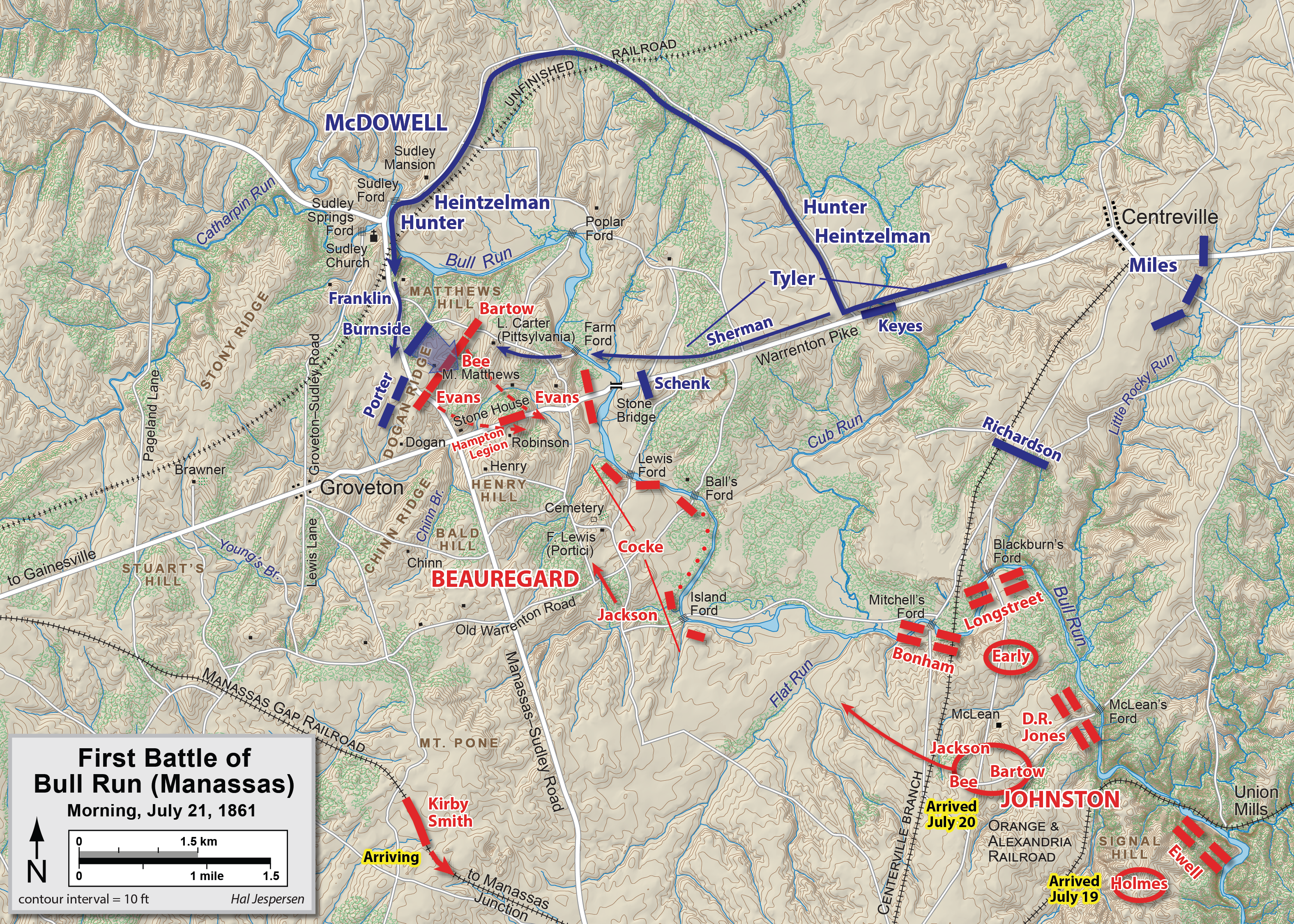
Situation morning, July 21

On the morning of July 21, McDowell sent the divisions of Hunter and Heintzelman (about 12,000 men) from Centreville at 2:30 a.m., marching southwest on the Warrenton Turnpike and then turning northwest toward Sudley Springs to get around the Confederates' left. Tyler's division (about 8,000) marched directly toward the Stone Bridge. The inexperienced units immediately developed logistical problems. Tyler's division blocked the advance of the main flanking column on the turnpike. The later units found the approach roads to Sudley Springs were inadequate, little more than a cart path in some places, and did not begin fording Bull Run until 9:30 a.m. Tyler's men reached the Stone Bridge around 6 a.m.

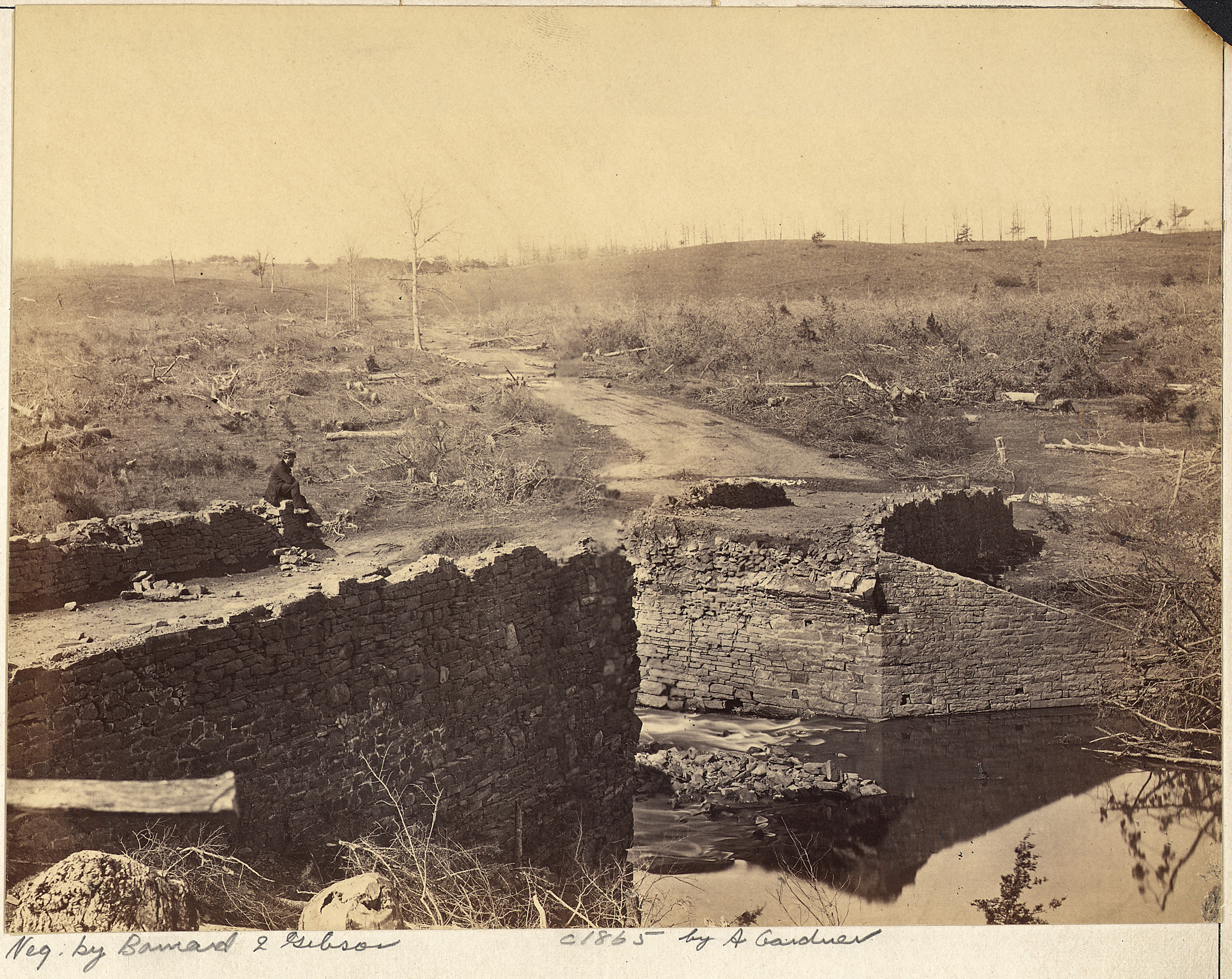
Ruins of the Stone Bridge, photographed by George N. Barnard c. 1865

At 5:15 a.m., Richardson's brigade fired a few artillery rounds across Mitchell's Ford on the Confederate right, some of which hit Beauregard's headquarters in the Wilmer McLean house as he was eating breakfast, alerting him to the fact that his offensive battle plan had been preempted. Nevertheless, he ordered demonstration attacks north toward the Union left at Centreville. Bungled orders and poor communications prevented their execution. Although he intended for Brig. Gen. Richard S. Ewell to lead the attack, Ewell, at Union Mills Ford, was simply ordered to "hold ... in readiness to advance at a moment's notice". Brig. Gen. D.R. Jones was supposed to attack in support of Ewell, but found himself moving forward alone. Holmes was also supposed to support, but received no orders at all.

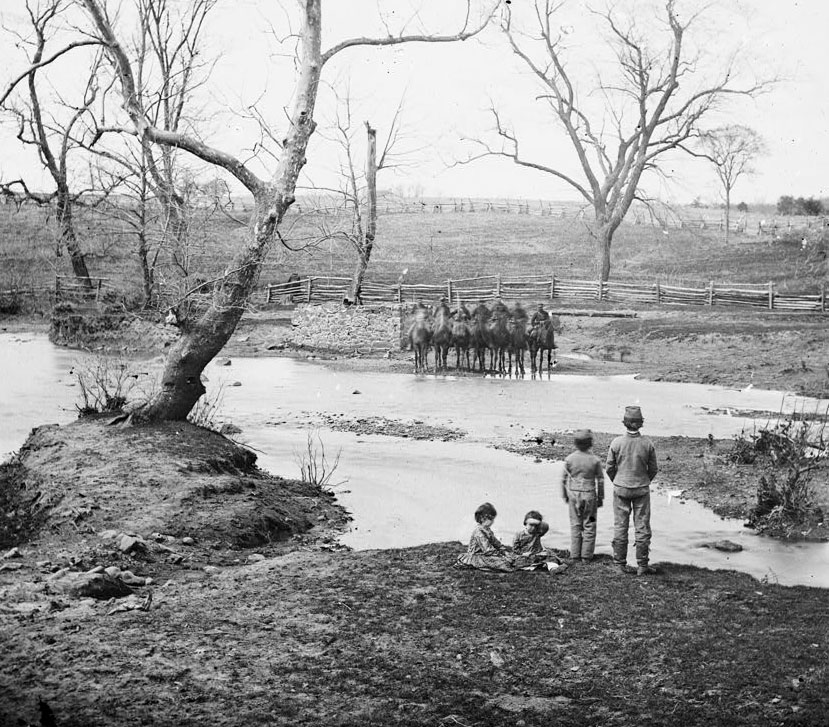
U.S. cavalry at Sudley Spring Ford

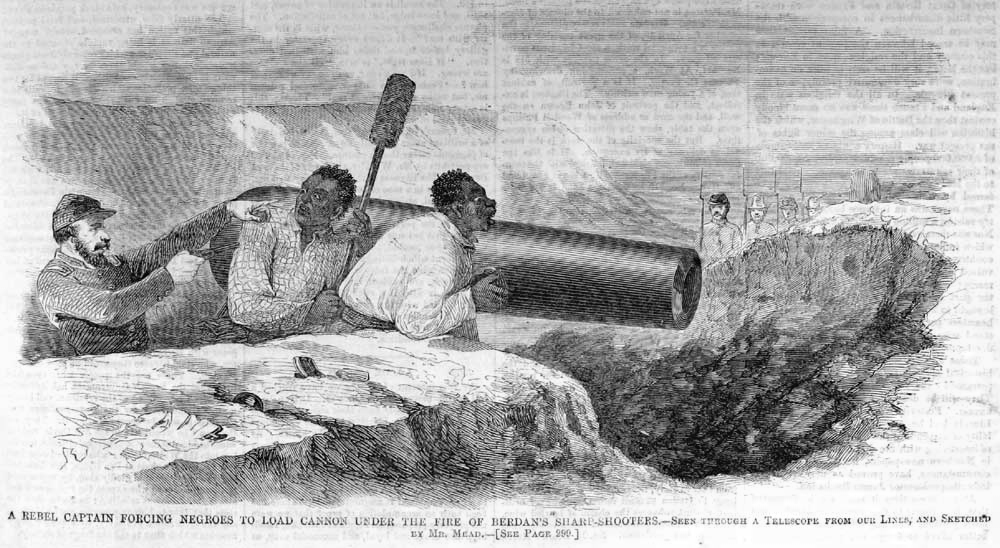
An 1862 illustration of a Confederate officer forcing slaves at gunpoint to load a cannon directed at U.S. forces. According to John Parker, a former slave, he was forced by his Confederate captors to fire a cannon at U.S. soldiers at the Battle of Bull Run.

All that stood in the path of the 20,000 Union soldiers converging on the Confederate left flank were Col. Nathan "Shanks" Evans and his reduced brigade of 1,100 men. Evans had moved some of his men to intercept the direct threat from Tyler at the bridge, but he began to suspect that the weak attacks from the Union brigade of Brig. Gen. Robert C. Schenck were merely feints. He was informed of the main Union flanking movement through Sudley Springs by Captain Edward Porter Alexander, Beauregard's signal officer, observing from 8 miles (13 km) southwest on Signal Hill. In the first use of wig-wag semaphore signaling in combat, Alexander sent the message "Look out for your left, your position is turned." Evans hastily led 900 of his men from their position fronting the Stone Bridge to a new location on the slopes of Matthews Hill, a low rise to the northwest of his previous position.

The Confederate delaying action on Matthews Hill included a spoiling attack launched by Major Roberdeau Wheat's 1st Louisiana Special Battalion, "Wheat's Tigers". After Wheat's command was thrown back, and Wheat seriously wounded, Evans received reinforcement from two other brigades under Brig. Gen. Barnard Bee and Col. Francis S. Bartow, bringing the force on the flank to 2,800 men. They successfully slowed Hunter's lead brigade (Brig. Gen. Ambrose Burnside) in its attempts to ford Bull Run and advance across Young's Branch, at the northern end of Henry House Hill. One of Tyler's brigade commanders, Col. William Tecumseh Sherman, moved forward from the stone bridge around 10:00 a.m., and crossed at an unguarded ford and struck the right flank of the Confederate defenders. This surprise attack, coupled with pressure from Burnside and Maj. George Sykes, collapsed the Confederate line shortly after 11:30 a.m., sending them in a disorderly retreat to Henry House Hill.

(Further map details, see: Additional Map 4, Additional Map 5, Additional Map 6 and Additional Map 7.)

=== Noon phase ===
==== Henry House Hill ====
As they retreated from their Matthews Hill position, the remainder of Evans's, Bee's, and Bartow's commands received some cover from Capt. John D. Imboden and his battery of four 6-pounder guns, who held off the Union advance while the Confederates attempted to regroup on Henry House Hill. They were met by generals Johnston and Beauregard, who had just arrived from Johnston's headquarters at the M. Lewis Farm, "Portici". Fortunately for the Confederates, McDowell did not press his advantage and attempt to seize the strategic ground immediately, choosing to bombard the hill with the batteries of Capts. James B. Ricketts (Battery I, 1st U.S. Artillery) and Charles Griffin (Battery D, 5th U.S.) from Dogan's Ridge.

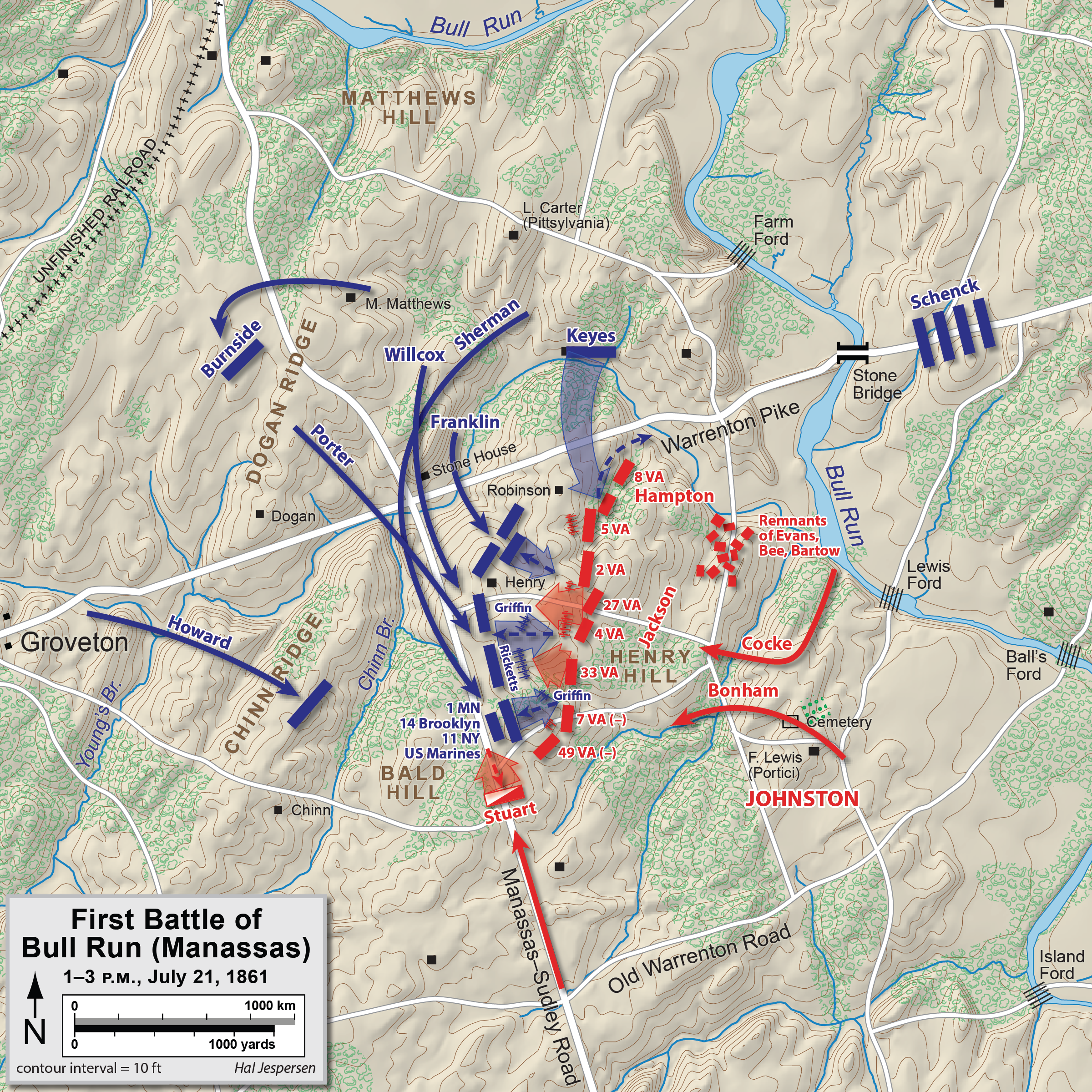
Attacks on Henry House Hill, 1–3 p.m

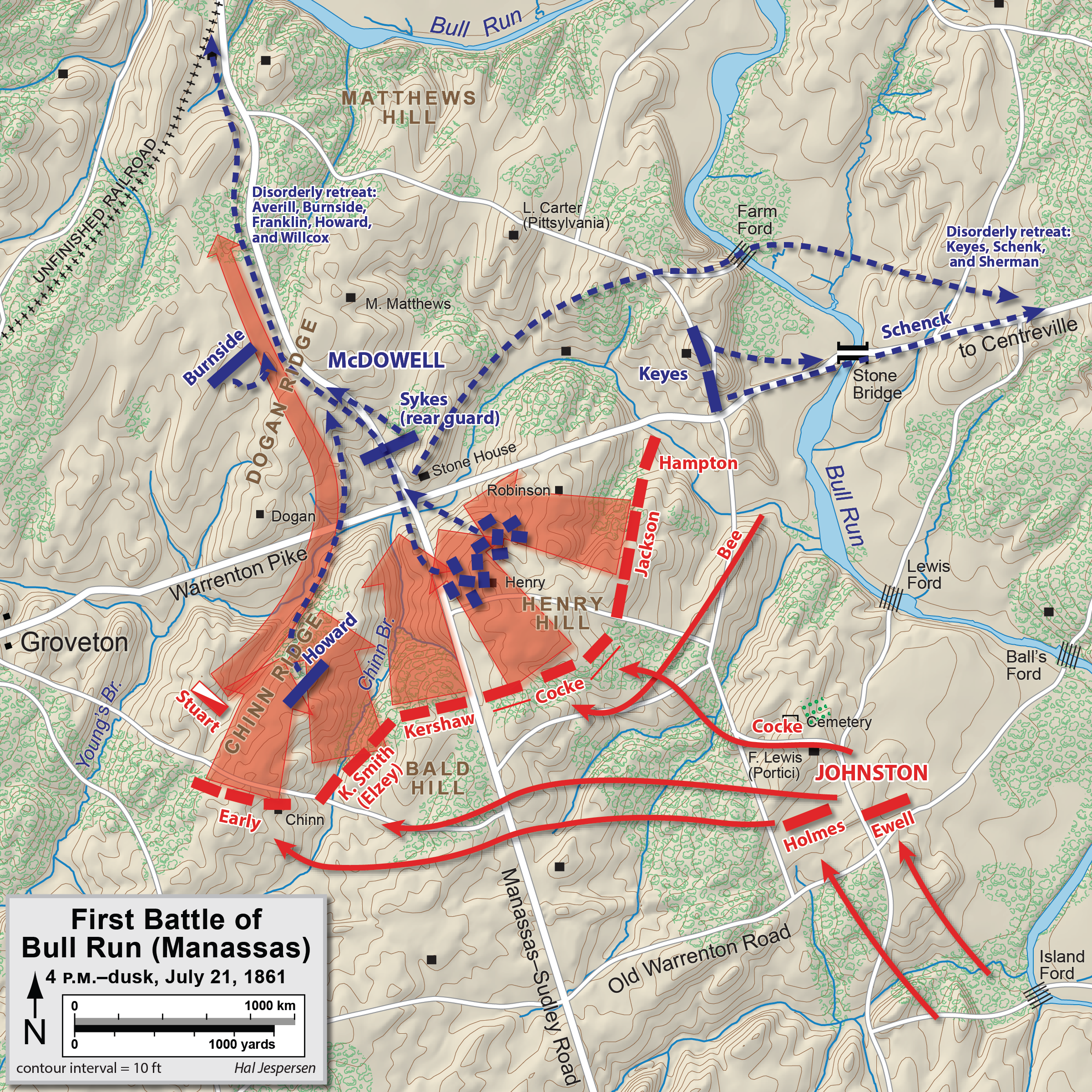
Union retreat, after 4 p.m.

Brig. Gen Thomas J. Jackson's Virginia Brigade came up in support of the disorganized Confederates around noon, accompanied by Col. Wade Hampton and his Hampton's Legion, and Col. J.E.B. Stuart's cavalry along with a contingent of 6-pounder guns. The Hampton Legion, some 600 men strong, managed to buy Jackson time to construct a defensive line on Henry House Hill by firing repeated volleys at Sherman's advancing brigade. Hampton had purchased approximately 400 Pattern 1853 Enfield rifles to equip the men with; however, it is not clear if his troops had them at Bull Run or if the weapons arrived after the battle. If so, they would have been the only foreign-made weapons on the field. The 79th New York was thoroughly decimated by Hampton's musket fire and began to disintegrate. Wade Hampton gestured towards their colonel, James Cameron, and remarked "Look at that brave officer trying to lead his men and they won't follow him." Shortly afterwards, Cameron, the brother of US Secretary of War Simon Cameron, was fatally wounded. It has been claimed that Hampton deliberately targeted officers of the 79th New York in revenge for the death of his nephew earlier in the day, although he had in fact been killed by soldiers of the 69th New York.

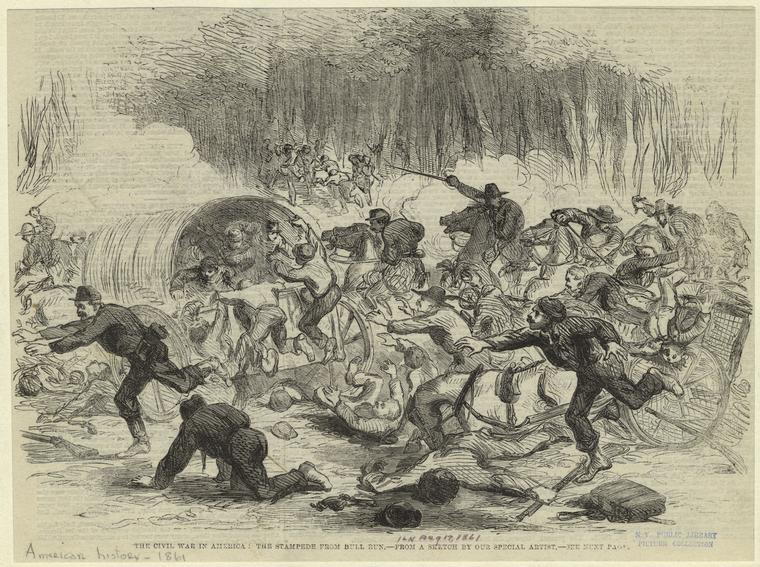
The stampede from Bull Run by Frank Vizetelly, Illustrated London News

Jackson posted his five regiments on the reverse slope of the hill, where they were shielded from direct fire, and was able to assemble 13 guns for the defensive line, which he posted on the crest of the hill; as the guns fired, their recoil moved them down the reverse slope, where they could be safely reloaded. Meanwhile, McDowell ordered the batteries of Ricketts and Griffin to move from Dogan's Ridge to the hill for close infantry support. Their 11 guns engaged in a fierce artillery duel across 300 yards (270 m) against Jackson's 13. Unlike many engagements in the Civil War, here the Confederate artillery had an advantage. The Union pieces were now within range of the Confederate smoothbores and the predominantly rifled pieces on the Union side were not effective weapons at such close ranges, with many shots fired over the head of their targets.

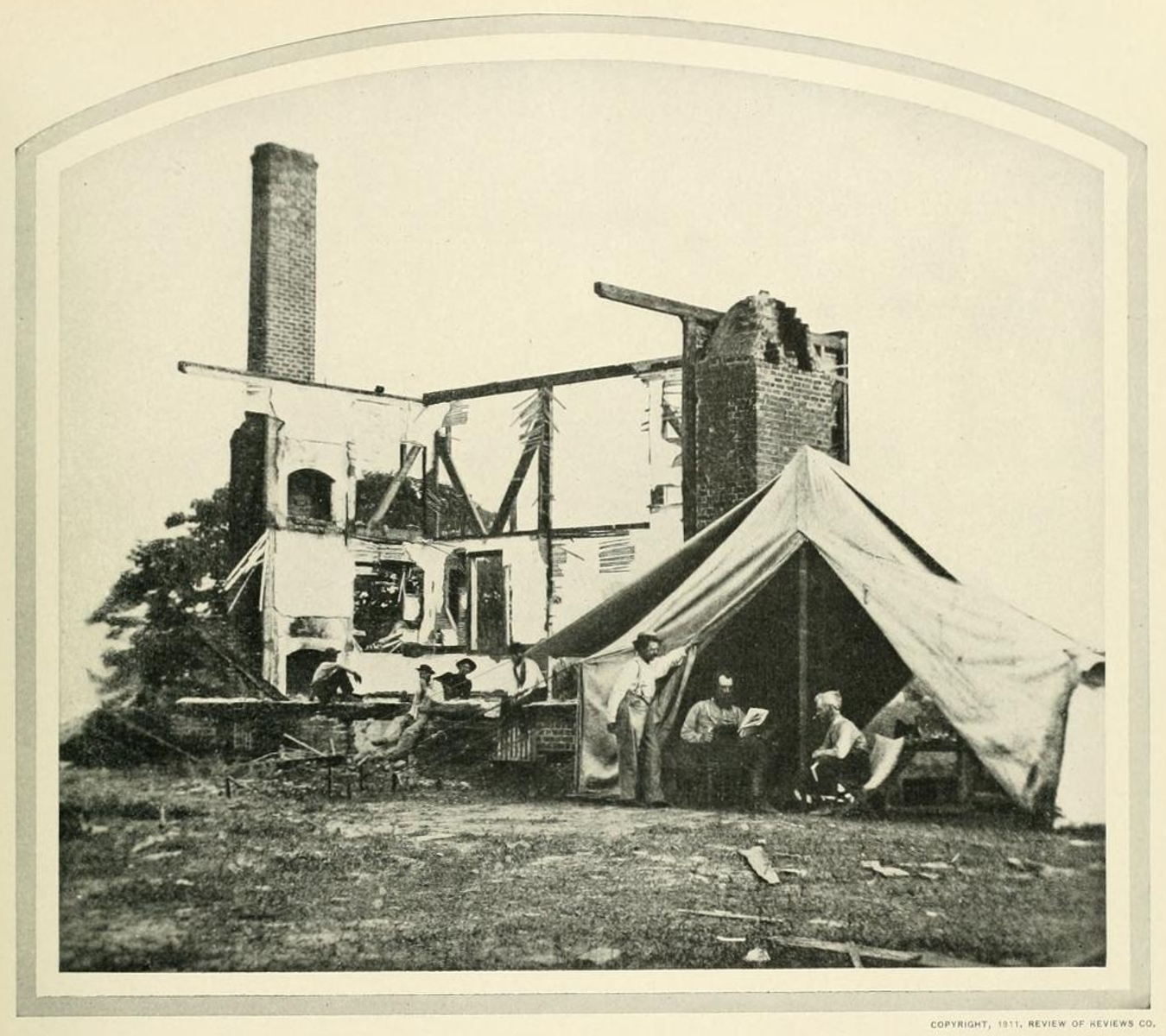
Ruins of Judith Henry's house, "Spring Hill", after the battle

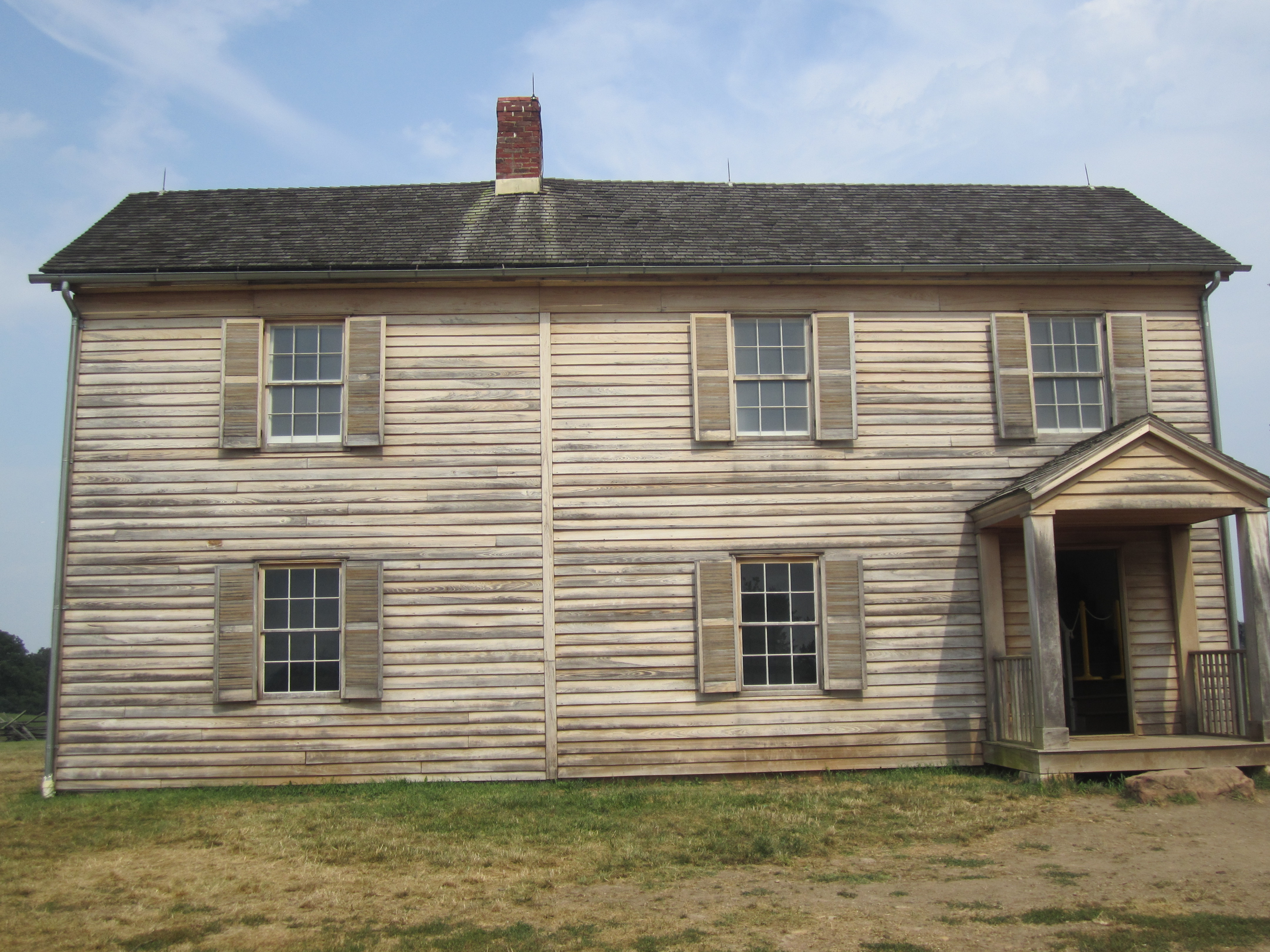
Postwar house on site of Judith Henry house in Manassas

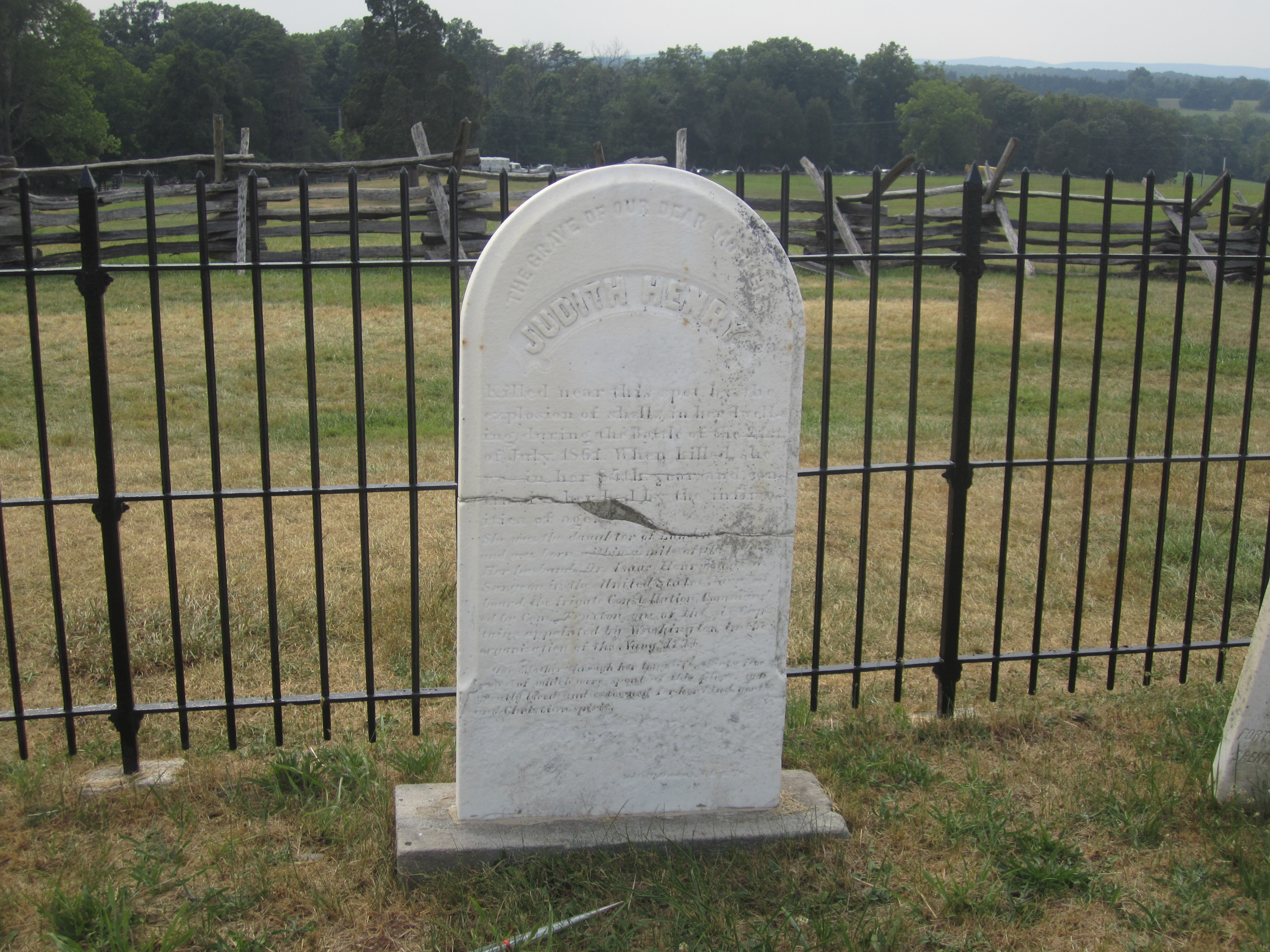
Judith Henry grave

One of the casualties of the artillery fire was Judith Carter Henry, an 85-year-old widow and invalid, who was unable to leave her bedroom in the Henry House. As Ricketts began receiving rifle fire, he concluded that it was coming from the Henry House and turned his guns on the building. A shell that crashed through the bedroom wall tore off one of the widow's feet and inflicted multiple injuries, from which she died later that day.

As his men were pushed back towards Henry House Hill, Bee exclaimed to Jackson, "The Enemy are driving us." Jackson, a former U.S. Army officer and professor at the Virginia Military Institute, is said to have replied, "Then, Sir, we will give them the bayonet." Bee is then said to have exhorted his own troops to re-form by shouting, "There is Jackson standing like a stone wall. Let us determine to die here, and we will conquer. Rally behind the Virginians." This exclamation is often held to be the source for Jackson's (and his brigade's) nickname, "Stonewall". Bee was shot through the stomach shortly afterwards and died the next day, thus it is unclear exactly what he said or meant. Moreover, none of his subordinates wrote reports of the battle, so there is no first-hand account of the exchange. Major Burnett Rhett, chief of staff to General Johnston, claimed that Bee was angry at Jackson's failure to come immediately to the relief of Bee's and Bartow's brigades while they were under heavy pressure. Those who subscribe to this opinion believe that Bee's statement was meant to be pejorative: "Look at Jackson standing there like a stone wall!" After Bee's wounding, Col. States Rights Gist, serving as Bee's aide-de-camp, took command of the brigade.

Artillery commander Griffin decided to move two of his guns to the southern end of his line, hoping to provide enfilade fire against the Confederates. At approximately 3 p.m., these guns were overrun by the 33rd Virginia, whose men were outfitted in blue uniforms, causing Griffin's commander, Maj. William F. Barry, to mistake them for Union troops and to order Griffin not to fire on them. Close range volleys from the 33rd Virginia followed by Stuart's cavalry attack against the flank of the 11th New York Volunteer Infantry Regiment (Ellsworth's Fire Zouaves), which was supporting the battery, killed many of the gunners and scattered the infantry. Capitalizing on this success, Jackson ordered two regiments to charge Ricketts's guns and they were captured as well. As additional Federal infantry engaged, the Confederates were pushed back and they reformed and the guns changed hands several times.

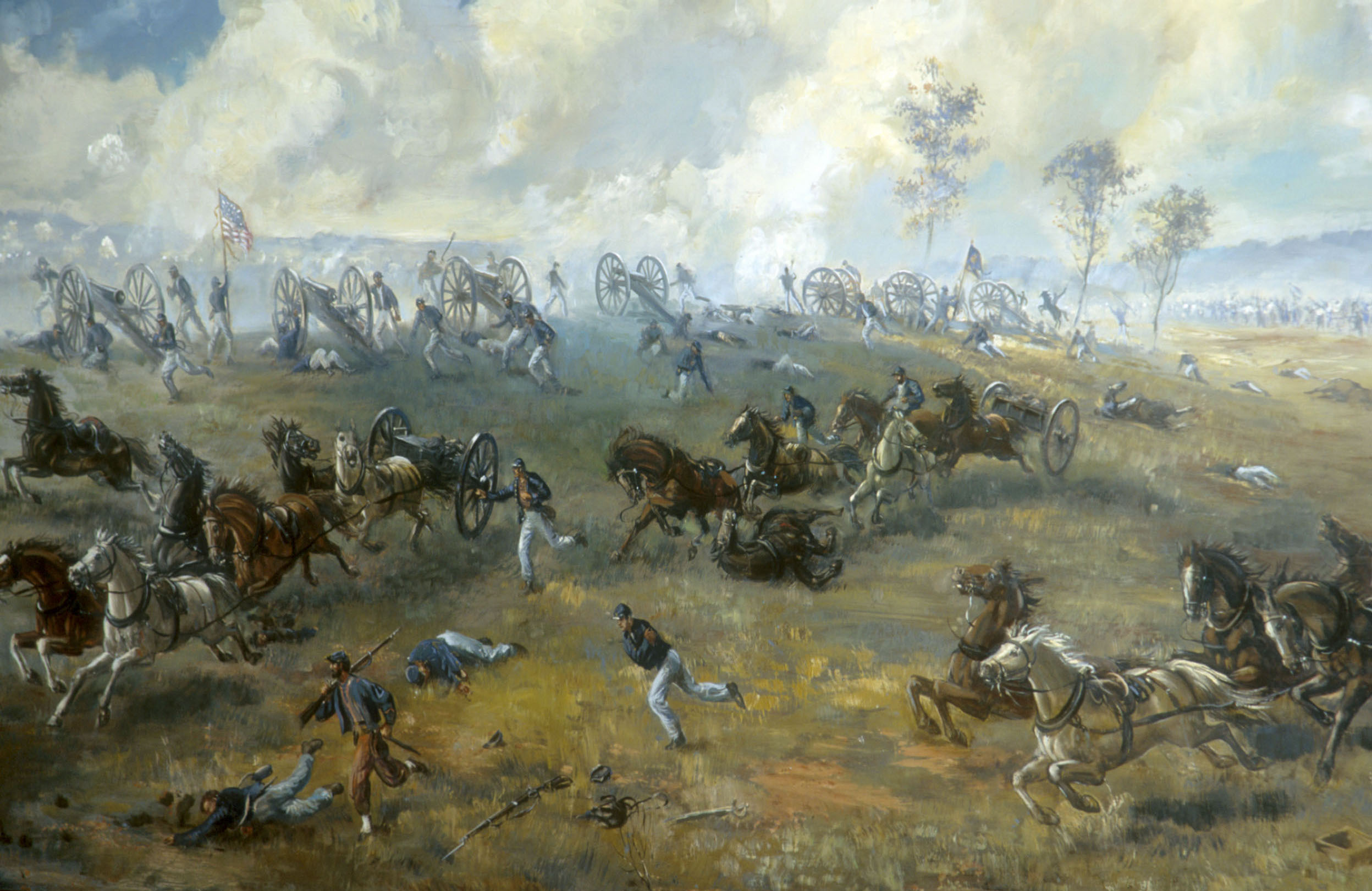
Capture of Ricketts' Battery, painting by Sidney E. King, National Park Service

The capture of the Union guns turned the tide of battle. Although McDowell had brought 15 regiments into the fight on the hill, outnumbering the Confederates two to one, no more than two were ever engaged simultaneously. Jackson continued to press his attacks, telling soldiers of the 4th Virginia Infantry, "Reserve your fire until they come within 50 yards! Then fire and give them the bayonet! And when you charge, yell like furies!" For the first time, Union troops heard the disturbing sound of the Rebel yell. At about 4 p.m., the last Union troops were pushed off Henry House Hill by a charge of two regiments from Col. Philip St. George Cocke's brigade.

To the west, Chinn Ridge had been occupied by Col. Oliver Otis Howard's brigade from Heintzelman's division. But at 4 p.m., two Confederate brigades-Col. Jubal Early's, which had moved from the Confederate right, and Brig. Gen. Edmund Kirby Smith's (commanded by Col. Arnold Elzey after Smith was wounded), which had just arrived from the Shenandoah Valley, moved forward and crushed Howard's brigade. Beauregard ordered his entire line forward, and the Union troops began to panic in retreat. At 5 p.m. everywhere McDowell's army was disintegrating. Thousands, in large and small groups or as individuals, began to leave the battlefield and head for Centreville in a rout. McDowell rode around the field trying to rally regiments and groups of soldiers, but most had had enough. Unable to stop the mass exodus, McDowell gave orders for Porter's regular infantry battalion, near the intersection of the turnpike and Manassas-Sudley Road, to act as a rear guard as his army withdrew. The unit briefly held the crossroads, then retreated eastward with the rest of the army. McDowell's force crumbled and began to retreat.

(Further map details, see: Additional Map 8, Additional Map 9, Additional Map 10, Additional Map 11 and Additional Map 12.)

=== Union retreat ===
The retreat was relatively orderly up to the Bull Run crossings, but was poorly managed by the Union officers. A Union wagon was overturned by artillery fire on a bridge spanning Cub Run Creek, inciting panic in McDowell's force. As the soldiers streamed uncontrollably toward Centreville, discarding their arms and equipment, McDowell ordered Col. Dixon S. Miles's division to act as a rear guard, but it was impossible to rally the army short of Washington. In the disorder that followed, hundreds of Union troops were taken prisoner. Wagons and artillery were abandoned, including the 30-pounder Parrott rifle, which had opened the battle with such fanfare. Expecting an easy Union victory, the wealthy elite of nearby Washington, including congressmen and their families, had come to picnic and watch the battle. When the Union army was driven back in a running disorder, the roads back to Washington were blocked by panicked civilians attempting to flee in their carriages. The pell-mell retreat became known in the Southern press as "The Great Skedaddle".

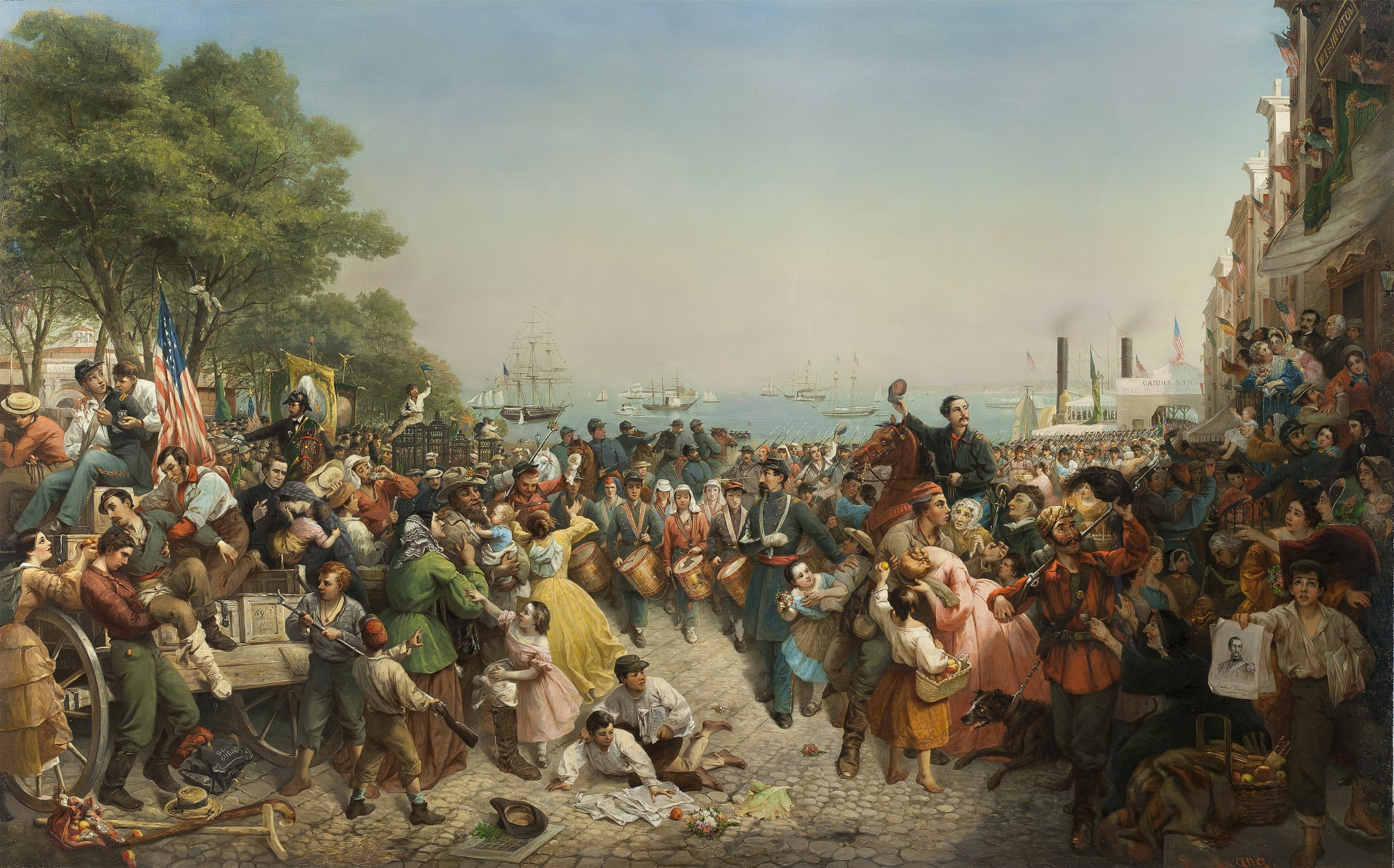
Return of the 69th (Irish) Regiment after the First Battle of Bull Run, July 27, 1861, painting by Louis Lang

Since their combined army had been left highly disorganized as well, Beauregard and Johnston did not fully press their advantage, despite urging from Confederate President Jefferson Davis, who had arrived on the battlefield to see the Union soldiers retreating. An attempt by Johnston to intercept the Union troops from his right flank, using the brigades of Brig. Gens. Milledge L. Bonham and James Longstreet, was a failure. The two commanders squabbled with each other and when Bonham's men received some artillery fire from the Union rear guard, and found that Richardson's brigade blocked the road to Centreville, he called off the pursuit.

In Washington, President Lincoln and members of the cabinet waited for news of a Union victory. Instead, a telegram arrived stating "General McDowell's army in full retreat through Centreville. The day is lost. Save Washington and the remnants of this army." The tidings were happier in the Confederate capital. From the battlefield President Davis telegraphed Richmond, "We have won a glorious but dear-bought victory. Night closed on the enemy in full flight and closely pursued."

== Aftermath ==
=== Brief observations ===
The battle was a clash between relatively large, ill-trained bodies of recruits, led by inexperienced officers. Neither army commander was able to deploy his forces effectively; although nearly 60,000 men were present at the battle, only 36,000 had actually been engaged. Although McDowell had been active on the battlefield, he had expended most of his energy maneuvering nearby regiments and brigades, instead of controlling and coordinating the movements of his army as a whole. Other factors contributed to McDowell's defeat: Patterson's failure to hold Johnston in the valley; McDowell's two-day delay at Centreville; allowing Tyler's division to lead the march on 21 July, thus delaying the flanking divisions of Hunter and Heintzelman; and the 2 1/2-hour delay after the Union victory on Matthews' Hill, which allowed the Confederates to bring up reinforcements and establish a defensive position on Henry Hill. On Henry Hill, Beauregard had also limited his control to the regimental level, generally allowing the battle to continue on its own and only reacting to Union moves. Johnston's decision to transport his infantry to the battlefield by rail played a major role in the Confederate victory. Although the trains were slow and a lack of sufficient cars did not allow the transport of large numbers of troops at one time, almost all of his army arrived in time to participate in the battle. After reaching Manassas Junction, Johnston had relinquished command of the battlefield to Beauregard, but his forwarding of reinforcements to the scene of fighting was decisive. Jackson and Bee's brigades had done the largest share of fighting in the battle; Jackson's brigade had fought almost alone for four hours and sustained over 50% casualties.

=== Detailed casualties ===
Bull Run was the largest and bloodiest battle in United States history up until that point. Union casualties were 460 killed, 1,124 wounded, and 1,312 missing or captured; Confederate casualties were 387 killed, 1,582 wounded, and 13 missing (a very high 10% casualty rate of the troops engaged in battle, excluding missing or captured). Among the Union dead was Col. James Cameron, the brother of President Lincoln's first Secretary of War, Simon Cameron. Among the Confederate casualties was Col. Francis S. Bartow, the first Confederate brigade commander to be killed in the Civil War. General Bee was mortally wounded and died the following day.

Compared to later battles, casualties at First Bull Run had not been especially heavy. Both Union and Confederate killed, wounded, and missing were a little over 1700 each. Two Confederate brigade commanders, Jackson, and Edmund Kirby-Smith were wounded in the battle. Jackson was shot in the hand and so he remained on the battlefield. No Union officers above the regimental level were killed; two division commanders (Samuel Heintzelman and David Hunter) and one brigade commander (Orlando Willcox) were wounded.

==== Union ====
Union casualties at the battle of Bull Run, July 21, 1861.

Army of Northeastern Virginia
Troops	Killed		Wounded		Missing		Total	Remarks
Troops	Officers	Enlisted Men	Officers	Enlisted Men	Officers	Enlisted Men	Total	Remarks
General staff	1						1	
First Division, General Tyler:								
First Brigade, Colonel Keyes		19	4	46	5	149	223	Eighteen others slightly wounded.
Second Brigade, General Schenck	3	16		15	1	15	50	
Third Brigade, Colonel Sherman	3	117	15	193	13	240	581	
Fourth Brigade, Colonel Richardson								Not engaged. Guarding Blackburn's Ford.
Total, First Division	6	152	19	254	19	404	854	
Second Division, Colonel Hunter:								
First Brigade, Colonel Porter	1	83	9	139	9	236	477	Four surgeons missing.
Second Brigade, Colonel Burnside	5	35	3	85	2	59	189	Five surgeons missing.
Total Second Division	6	118	12	224	11	295	666	
Third Division, Colonel Heintzelman:								
Division headquarters.			1				1	
First Brigade, Colonel Franklin	3	68	13	183	4	22	293	
Second Brigade, Colonel Willcox	1	70	11	161		186	429	
Third Brigade, Colonel Howard	2	48	7	108	6	174	345	
Total, Third Division	6	186	32	452	10	382	1,068	
Fourth Division, General Runyon							In reserve on the Potomac.	
Fifth Division, Colonel Miles								
First Brigade Colonel Blenker		6		16		94	116	
Second Brigade, Colonel Davies			1	1		1	3	
Total, Fifth Division		6	1	17		95	119	
Grand total	19	462	64	947	40	1,176	2,708	

Union artillery lost in the battle of Bull Run, July 21, 1861.

Batteries	Commanders	Guns lost			Remarks
Batteries	Commanders	Rifled	Smooth	Total	Remarks
First U. S. Artillery, Company G (two 20-pounder Parrotts, one 30-pounder Parrott).	Lieutenant Edwards	1		1	20-pounders saved
First U. S. Artillery, Company I (six 10-pounder Parrots)	Captain Ricketts	6		6	None saved
Second U. S. Artillery, Company D	Captain Arnold	2	2	4	None saved
Second U. S. Artillery, Company E (two 13-pounder James, two 6-pounders (old), two 12-pounder howitzers).	Captain Carlisle	2	2	4	Two 6-pounders saved
Fifth S. Artillery [Company D], (two 10-pounder Parrotts, two 6-pounders (old), two 12-pounder howitzers).	Captain Griffin	1	4	5	One 10-pounder saved
Rhode Island Battery (six 13-pounder James)		5		5	One saved
Total lost		17	8	25	

==== Confederate ====
Confederate casualties at the battle of Bull Run, July 21, 1861.

Command	Killed		Wounded		Missing		Aggregate
Command	Officers	Enlisted Men	Officers	Enlisted Men	Officers	Enlisted Men	Aggregate
ARMY OF THE POTOMAC
INFANTRY							
First Louisiana (battalion)		8	5	33		2	48
Seventh Louisiana		3		23			26
Thirteenth Mississippi				6			6
Seventeenth Mississippi		2		9			11
Eighteenth Mississippi	2	6	2	28			38
Fifth North Carolina		1		3			4
Second South Carolina		5	6	37			48
Fourth South Carolina	1	10	9	70		6	96
Fifth South Carolina		3		23			26
Eighth South Carolina		5	3	20			28
Hampton Legion		19		100		2	121
First Virginia				6			6
Seventh Virginia		9	1	37			47
Eighth Virginia		6		23		1	30
Seventeenth Virginia		1		3			4
Eighteenth Virginia		6	1	12			19
Nineteenth Virginia		1		4		1	6
Twenty-eighth Virginia				9			9
Forty-ninth Virginia		1	9	1	29		40
ARTILLERY							
Alexandria Light Artillery		1		2			3
Latham's				1			1
Loudoun				3			3
Washington (La.)		1		2			3
CAVALRY							
Thirtieth Virginia	2	3		4			9
Hanover			1	3			4
ARMY OF THE SHENANDOAH
INFANTRY							
Fourth Alabama	4	36	6	151			
Seventh Georgia	1	18	12	122			
Eighth Georgia	3	38	6	153			
First Maryland		1		5			
Second Mississippi	4	21	3	79	1		
Eleventh Mississippi		7		21			
Sixth North Carolina	1	22	4	46			
Third Tennessee		1		3			
Second Virginia	3	15	3	69			
Fourth Virginia	1	30		100			
Fifth Virginia		6		47			
Tenth Virginia		6		10			
Twenty-seventh Virginia	1	18		122			
Thirty-third Virginia	1	44		101			
Total First Corps	6	99	29	490		12	632
Total Second Corps	19	263	34	1,029	1		
Grand total	25	362	63	1,519	1	12	632

Today will be known as BLACK MONDAY. We are utterly and disgracefully routed, beaten, whipped by secessionists.

— Union diarist George Templeton Strong

If the war had turned out to be of short duration, Bull Run would have been a disaster for the Union. But if, as now seemed more plausible, a long and nasty war was inevitable, that battle had a curiously salutary effect for the Union side. It provided a wake-up call for those optimists—like Seward or even Lincoln—who had hoped for or counted on a quick result.

— David Detzer, Donnybrook

Bull Run was a turning point in the American Civil War ... in the sense that the battle struck with impelling force upon public opinion at home and abroad, upon Congress, and upon the Commander-in-chief. It framed new patterns of thought and led to far-reaching changes in the conduct of the war. The failure at Bull Run inspired a second Northern rising. Volunteering accelerated, 90-day men reenlisted, states rushed fresh regiments forward in plenitude. ... As they realized victory would not come readily, a new mood fastened upon Northerners. An iron resolve entered the Northern soul ...

— James A. Rawley, Turning Points of the Civil War

=== Effect on Union and subsequent events ===
Union forces and civilians alike feared that Confederate forces, 14,000 not engaged in the battle and thus rested, would advance on Washington, DC, only 27 miles away , with very little standing in their way. On July 24, Prof. Thaddeus S. C. Lowe ascended in the balloon Enterprise to observe the Confederates moving in and about Manassas Junction and Fairfax. He saw no evidence of massing Confederate forces but was forced to land in Confederate territory. It was overnight before he was rescued and could report to headquarters. He reported that his observations "restored confidence" to the Union commanders.

The Northern public was shocked at the unexpected defeat of their army when an easy victory had been widely anticipated, some Northerners having visited to overlook the battlefield and picnic at leisure. Both sides quickly came to realize that the war would be longer and more brutal than they had imagined. On July 22, President Lincoln signed a bill that provided for the enlistment of another 500,000 men for up to three years of service. On July 25, 11,000 Pennsylvanians who had earlier been rejected by the U.S. Secretary of War, Simon Cameron, for federal service in either Patterson's or McDowell's command arrived in Washington, DC, and were finally accepted.

Three months after the First Battle of Bull Run, Union forces suffered another, smaller defeat at the Battle of Ball's Bluff, near Leesburg, Virginia. The perceived military incompetence at both battles led to the establishment of the Joint Committee on the Conduct of the War, a congressional body created to investigate Northern military affairs. Concerning the Battle of First Bull Run, the committee listened to testimony from a variety of witnesses connected with McDowell's army. Although the committee's report concluded that the principal cause of defeat was Patterson's failure to prevent Johnston from reinforcing Beauregard, Patterson's enlistment had expired a few days after the battle, and he was no longer in the service. The Northern public clamored for another scapegoat, and McDowell bore the chief blame. On July 25, he was relieved of army command and replaced by Maj. Gen. George B. McClellan, who would soon be named general-in-chief of all the Union armies. McDowell was also present to bear significant blame for the defeat of Maj. Gen. John Pope's Army of Virginia by Gen. Robert E. Lee's Army of Northern Virginia thirteen months later, at the Second Battle of Bull Run.

=== Effect on Confederacy ===
The reaction in the Confederacy was more muted. There was little public celebration, as the Southerners realized that despite their victory, the greater battles that would inevitably come would mean greater losses for their side as well. Once the euphoria of victory had worn off, Jefferson Davis called for 400,000 additional volunteers.

Beauregard was considered the Confederate hero of the battle and was promoted that day by President Davis to full general in the Confederate army. Stonewall Jackson, arguably the most important tactical contributor to the victory, received no special recognition but would later achieve glory for his 1862 Valley campaign. Privately, Davis credited Greenhow with ensuring Confederate victory. Jordan sent a telegram to Greenhow: "Our President and our General direct me to thank you. We rely upon you for further information. The Confederacy owes you a debt. (Signed) JORDAN, Adjutant-General."

The battle also had long-term psychological consequences. The decisive victory led to a degree of overconfidence on the part of Confederate forces and prompted a determined organizational effort on the part of the Union. In hindsight, commentators on both sides agreed that the one-sided outcome "proved the greatest misfortune that would have befallen the Confederacy." Although modern historians generally agree with that interpretation, James M. McPherson has argued that the esprit de corps attained by Confederate troops on the heels of their victory, together with a new sense of insecurity felt by northern commanders, also gave the Confederacy a military edge in the following months.

=== "Bull Run" vs. "Manassas" ===
The name of the battle has caused controversy since 1861. The Union army frequently named battles after significant rivers and creeks that played a role in the fighting; the Confederates generally used the names of nearby towns or farms. The U.S. National Park Service uses the Confederate name for its national battlefield park, but the Union name (Bull Run) also has widespread currency in popular literature.

=== Confusion between battle flags ===
Battlefield confusion between the battle flags, especially the similarity of the Confederacy's "Stars and Bars" and the Union's "Stars and Stripes" when it was fluttering, led to the adoption of the Confederate Battle Flag, which eventually became the most popular symbol of the Confederacy and the South in general.

=== Conclusions ===
The First Battle of Bull Run demonstrated that the war would not be won by one grand battle, and both sides began preparing for a long and bloody conflict. The battle also showed the need for adequately trained and experienced officers and men. One year later, many of the same soldiers who had fought at First Bull Run, now combat veterans, would have an opportunity to test their skills on the same battlefield at the Second Battle of Bull Run/Manassas.

== Additional battle maps ==
=== Gallery: the First Bull Run hour by hour ===
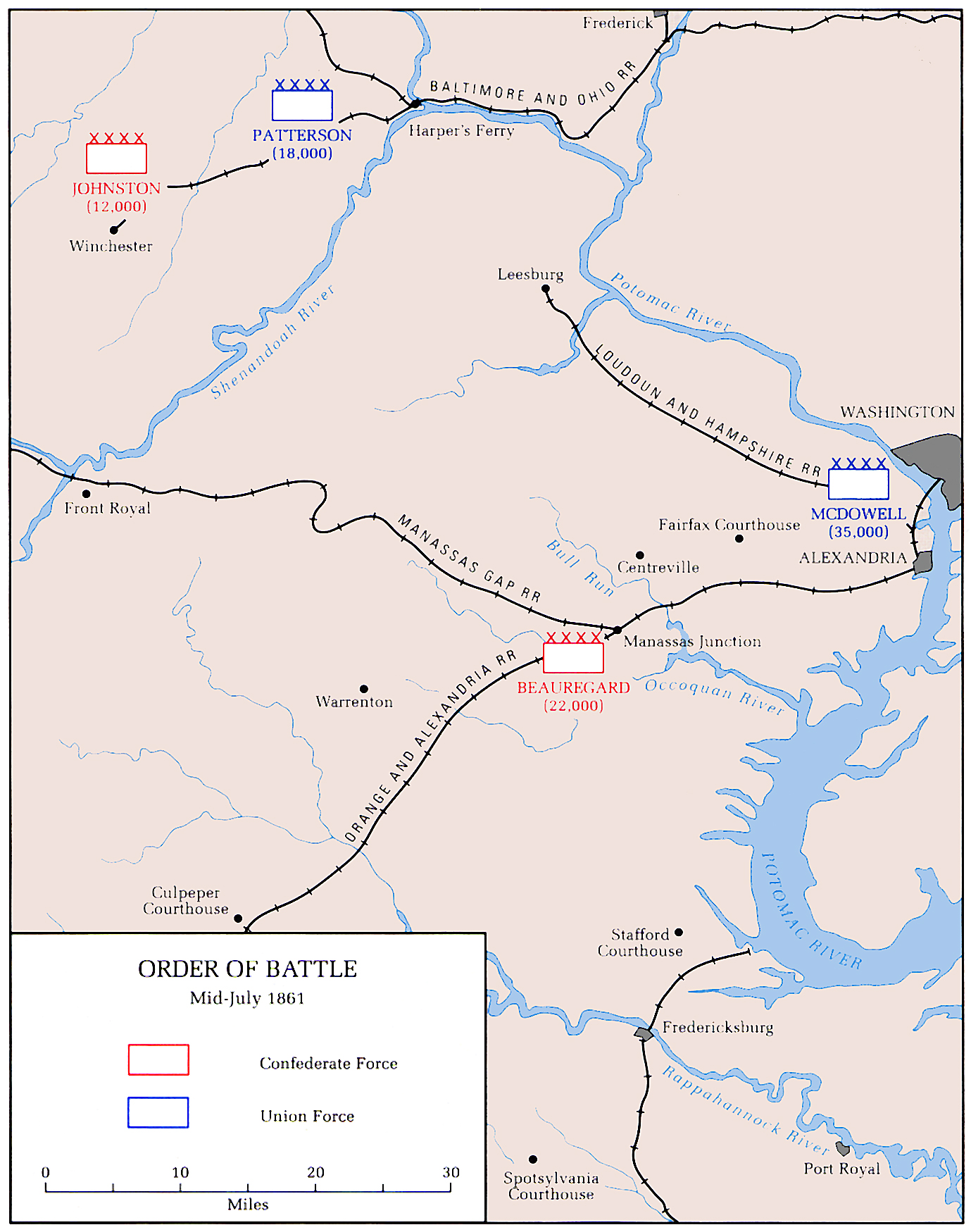
Map 1:
Situation Mid-July 1861

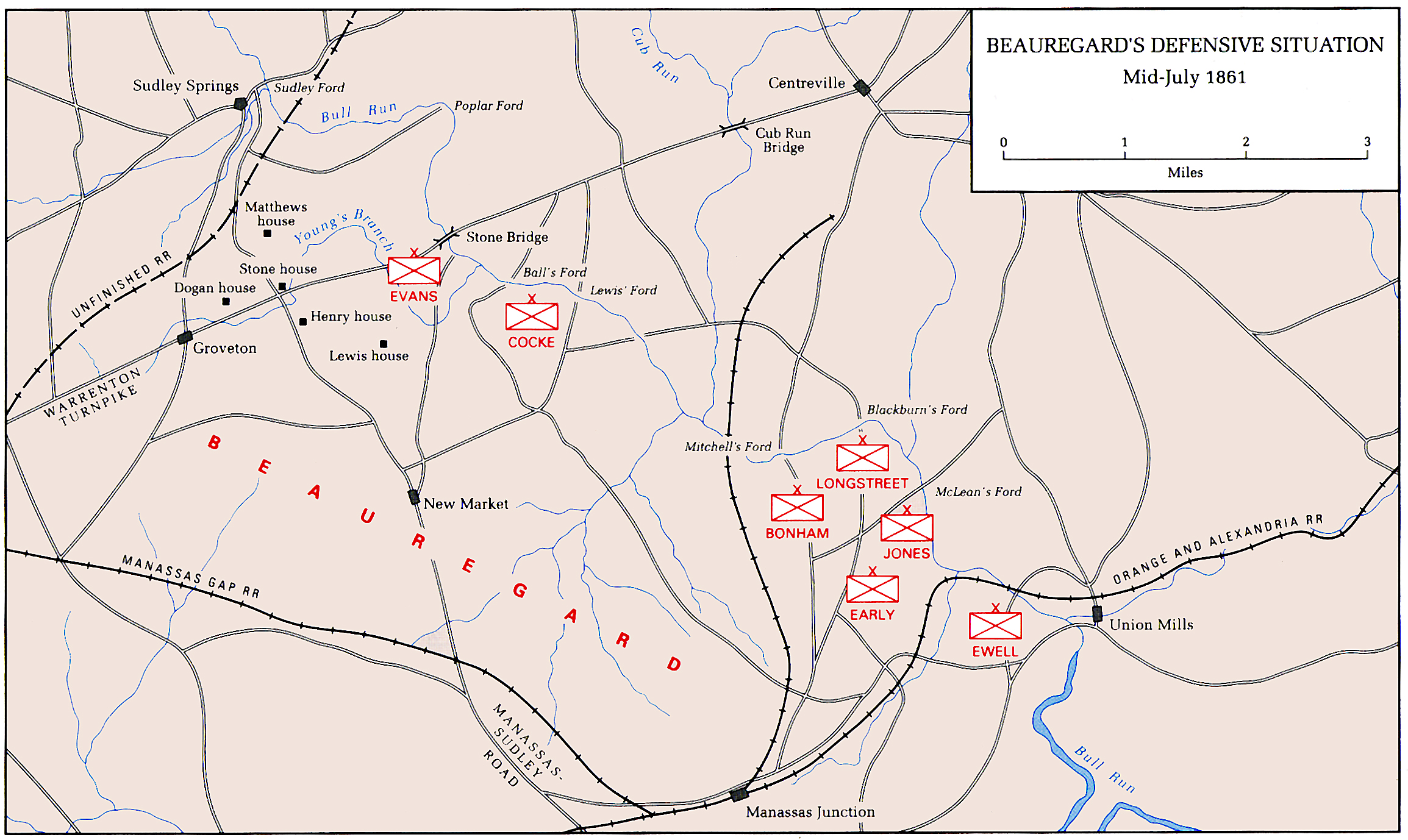
Map 2:
Beauregard's defensive situation
(Mid-July 1861)

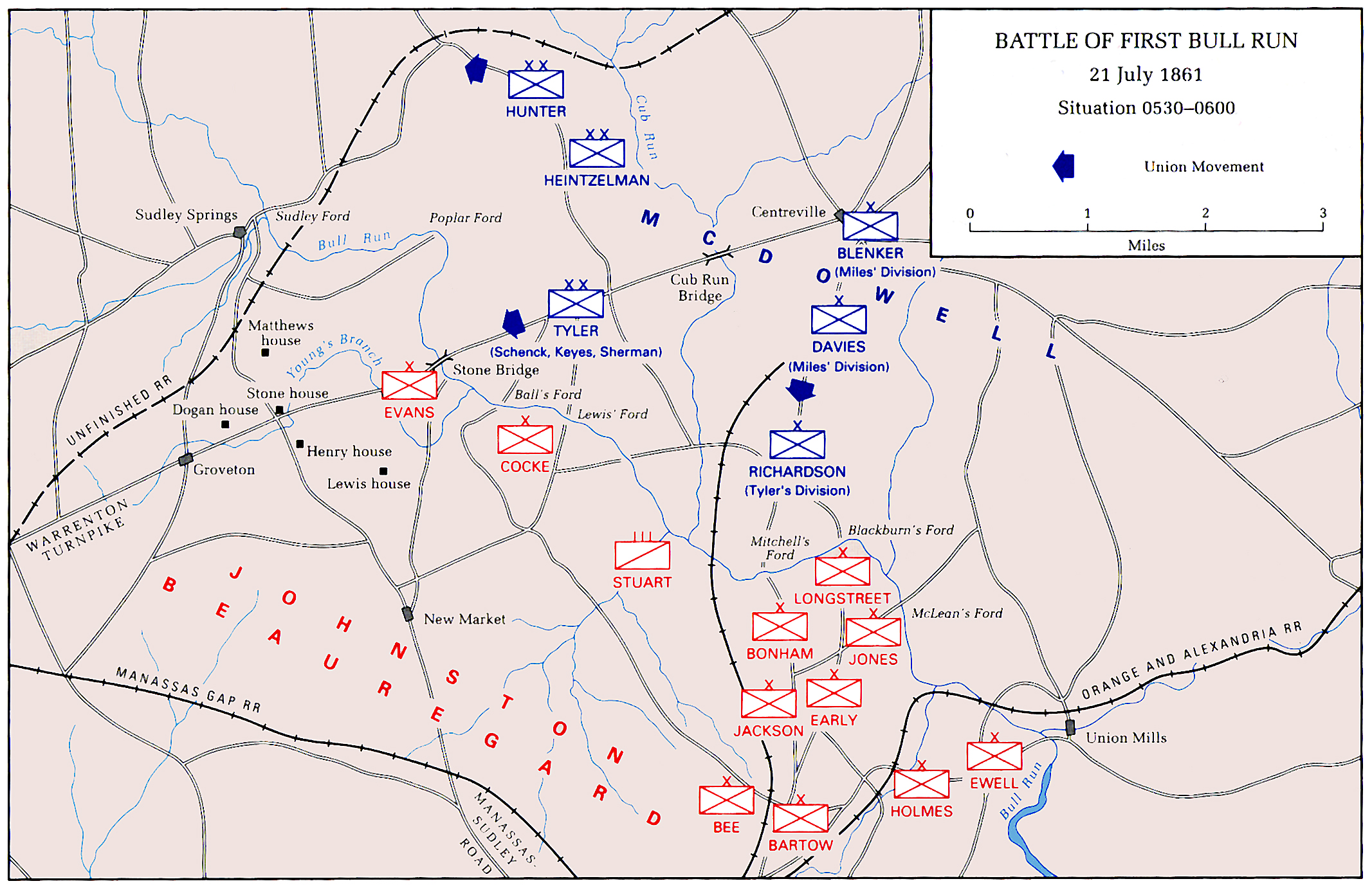
Map 3:
Situation at 05:30–06:00
(July 21, 1861)

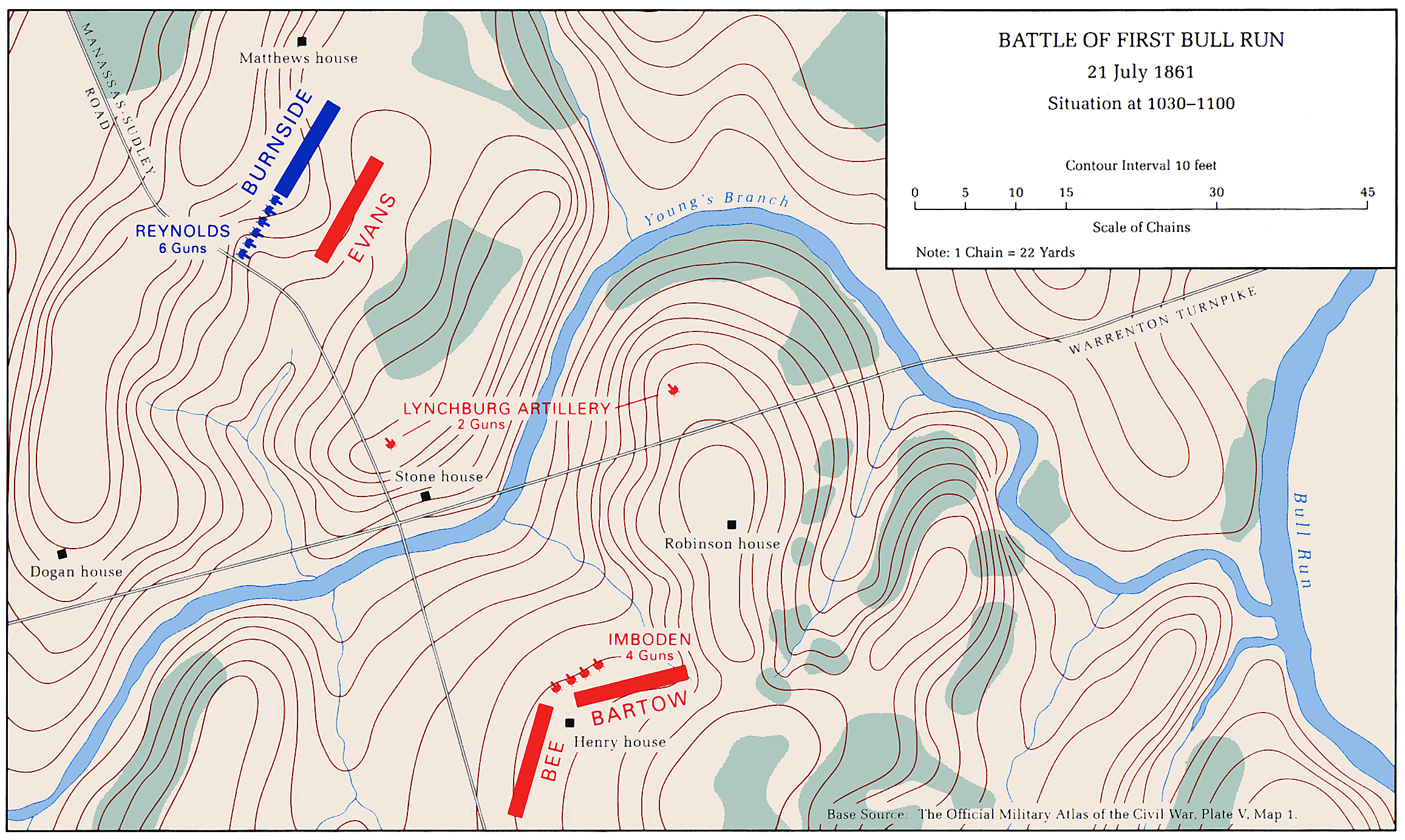
Map 4:
Situation at 10:30–11:00
(July 21, 1861)

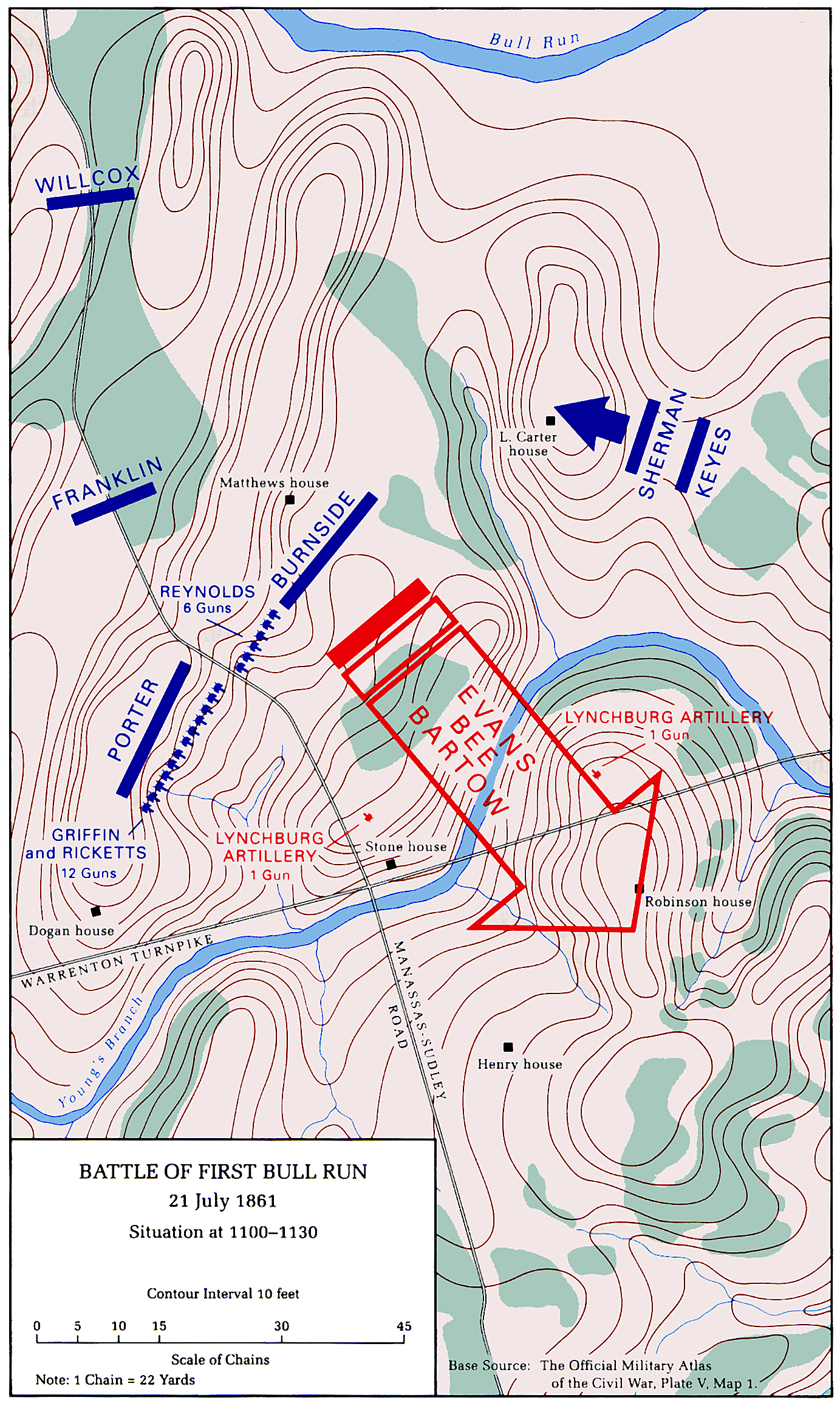
Map 5:
Situation at 11:00–11:30
(July 21, 1861)

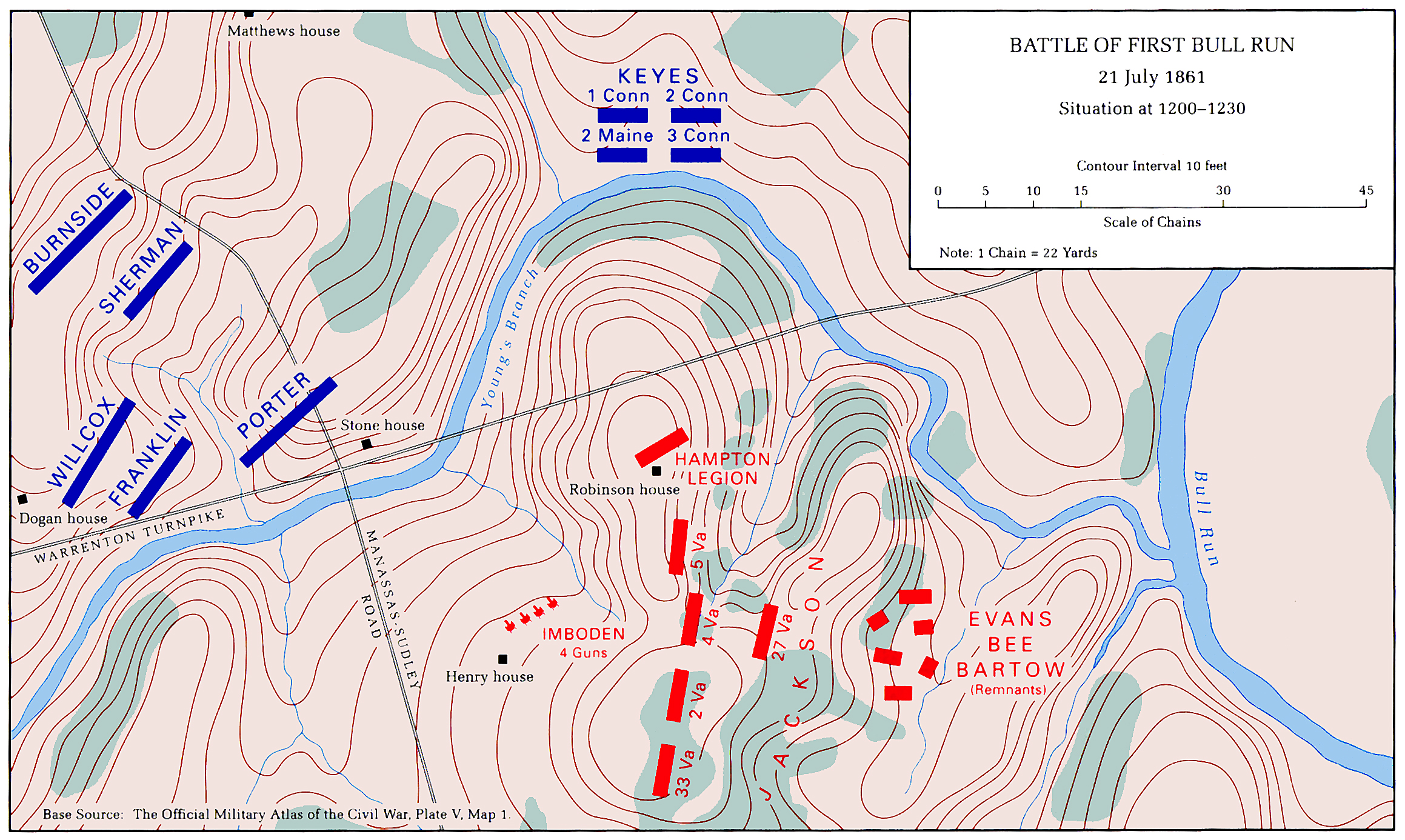
Map 6:
Situation at 12:00–12:30
(July 21, 1861)

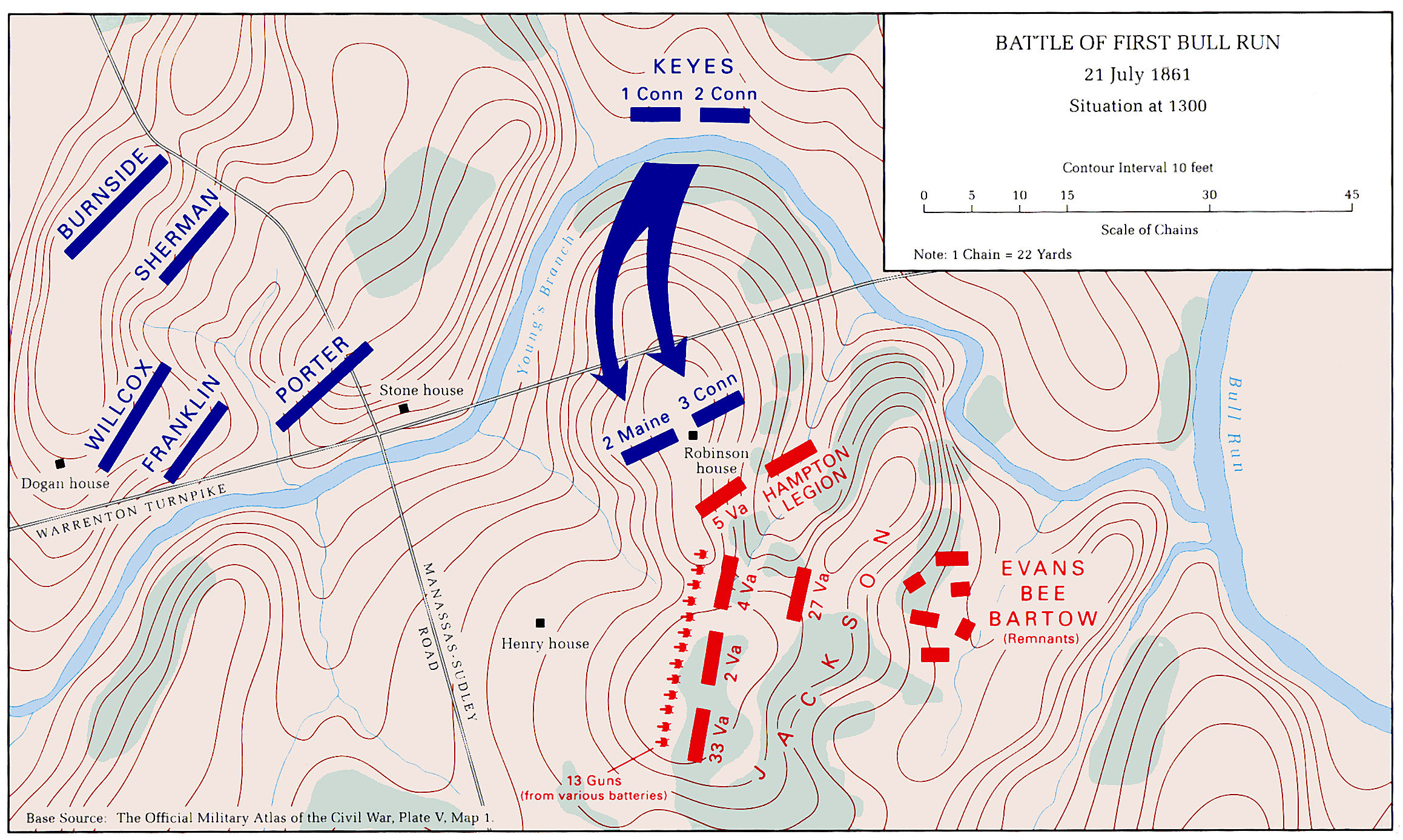
Map 7:
Situation at 13:00
(July 21, 1861)

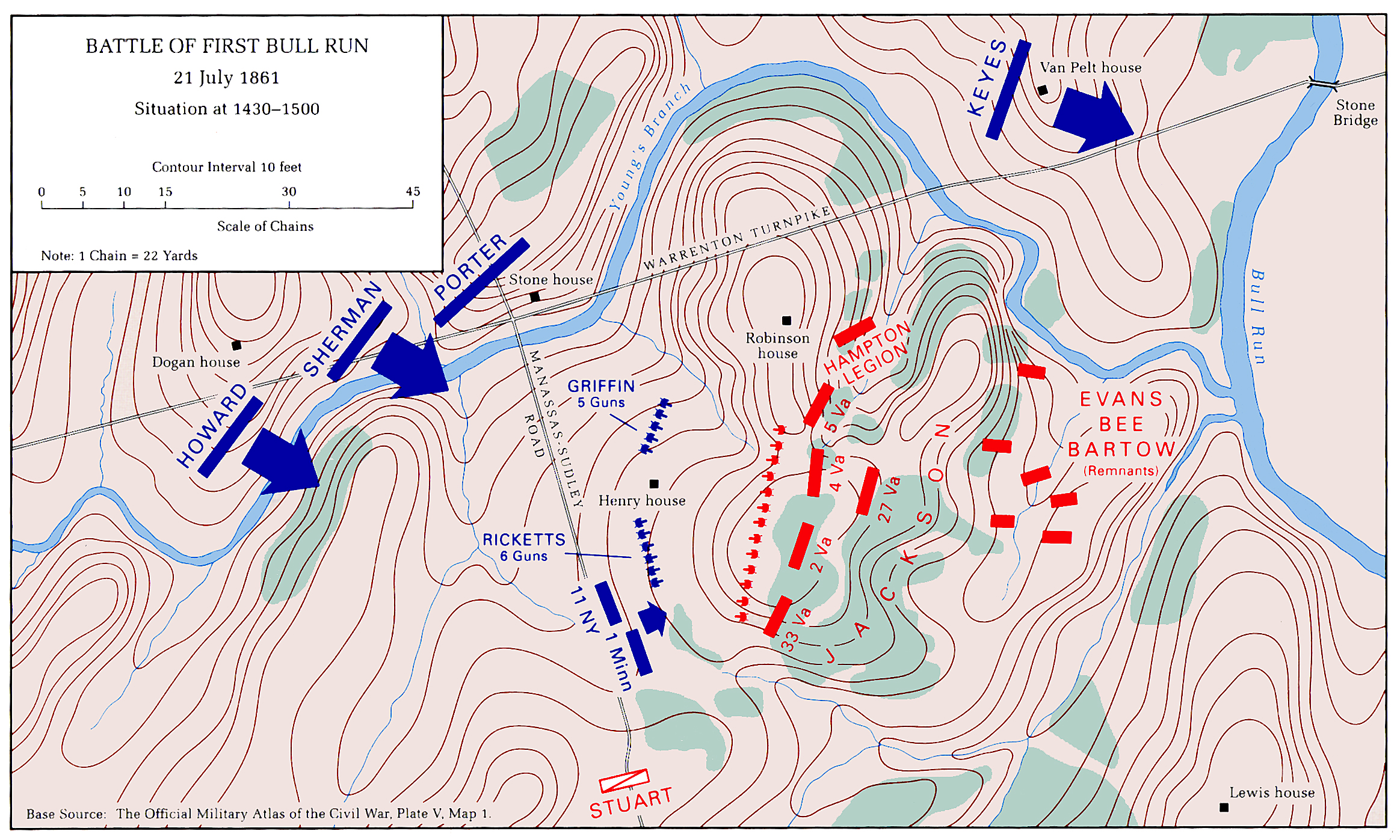
Map 8:
Situation at 14:30–15:00
(July 21, 1861)

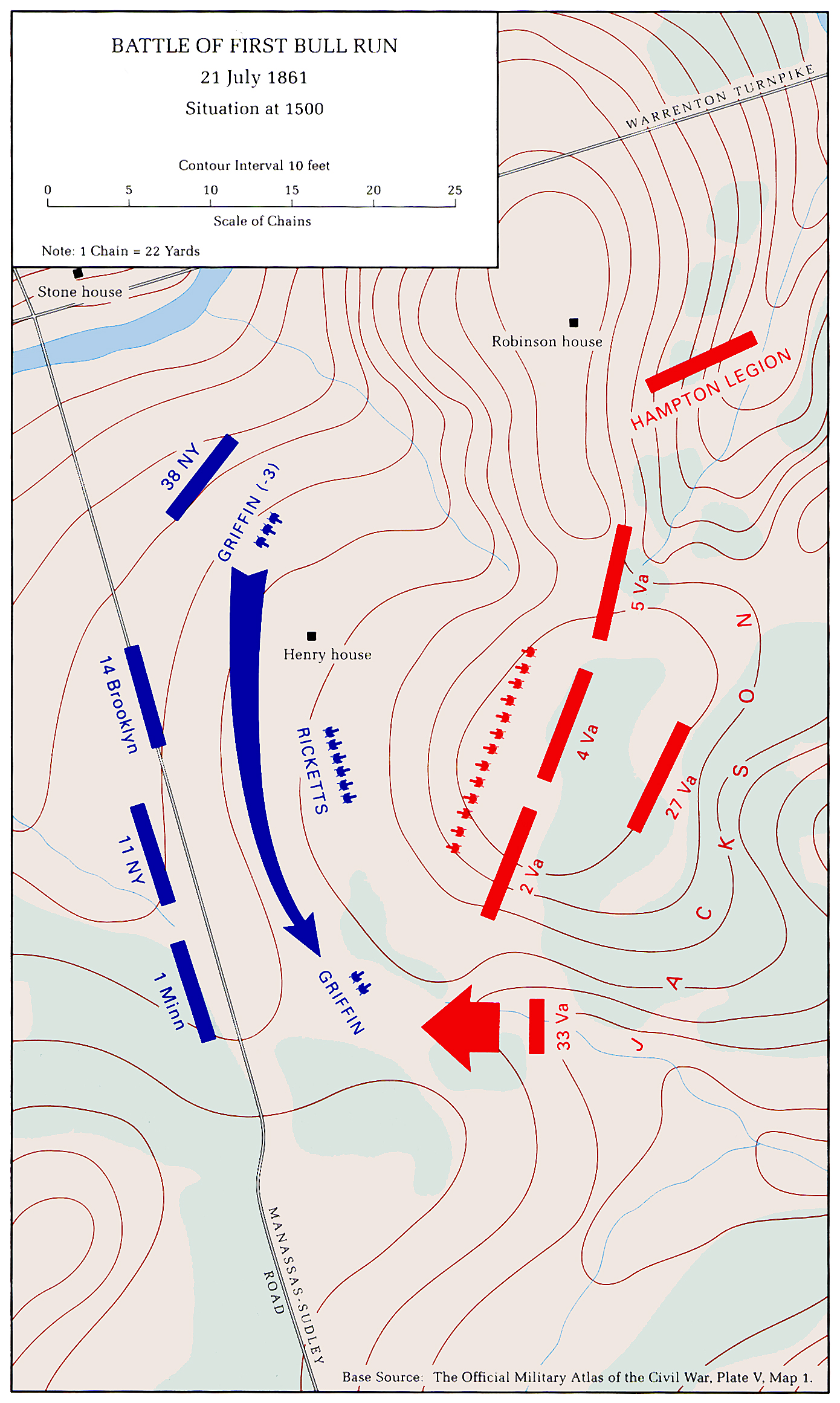
Map 9:
Situation at 15:00
(July 21, 1861)

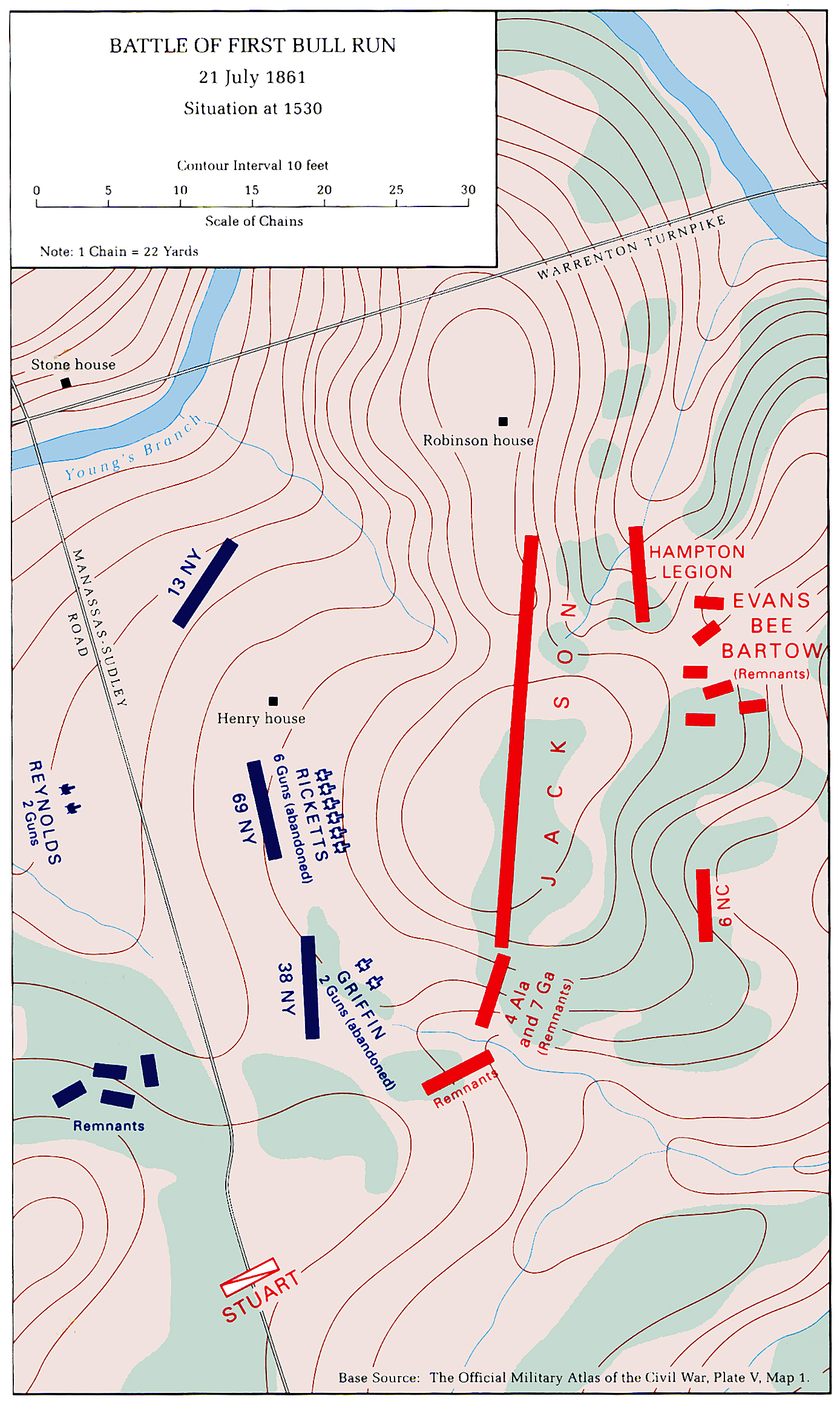
Map 10:
Situation at 15:30
(July 21, 1861)

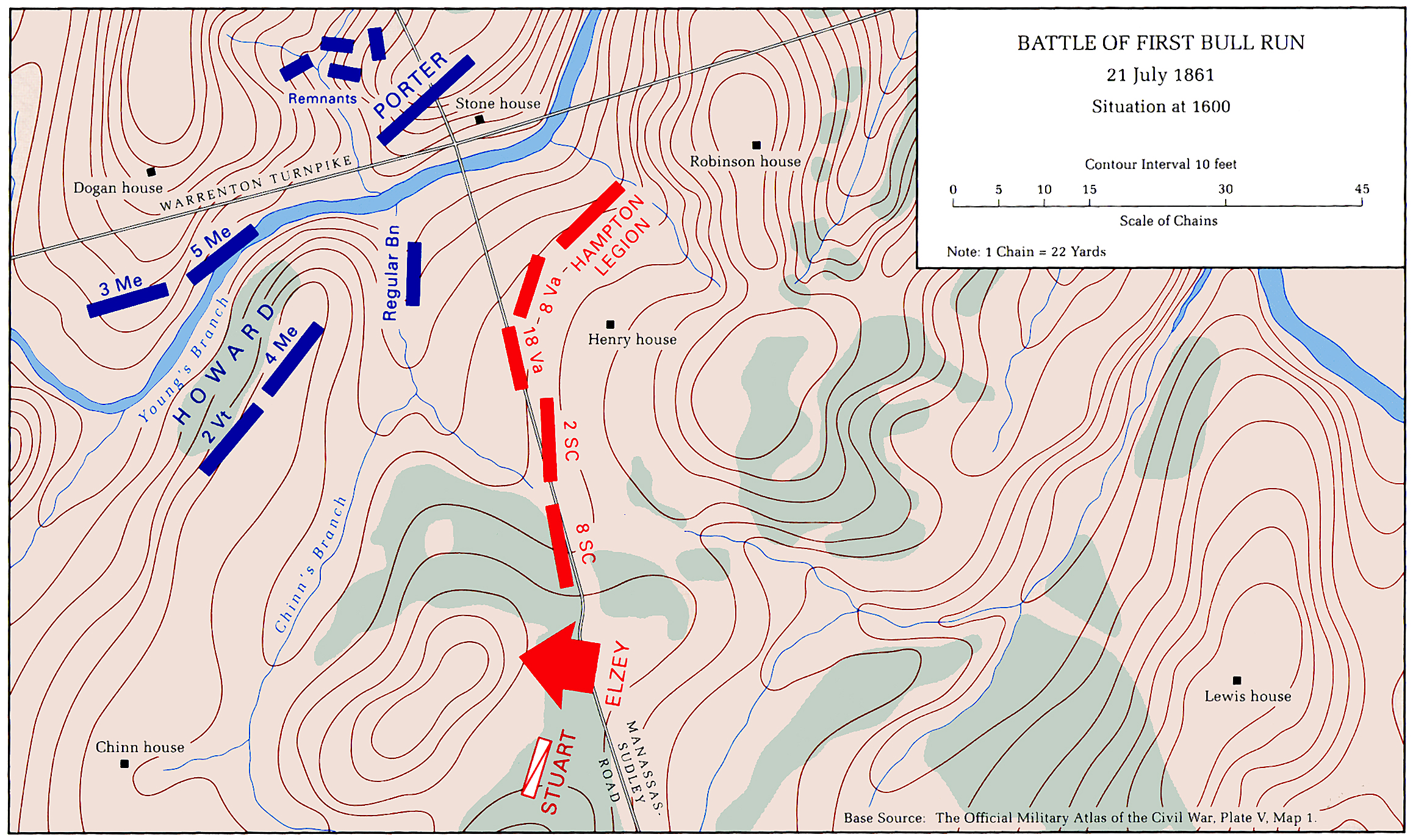
Map 11:
Situation at 16:00
(July 21, 1861)

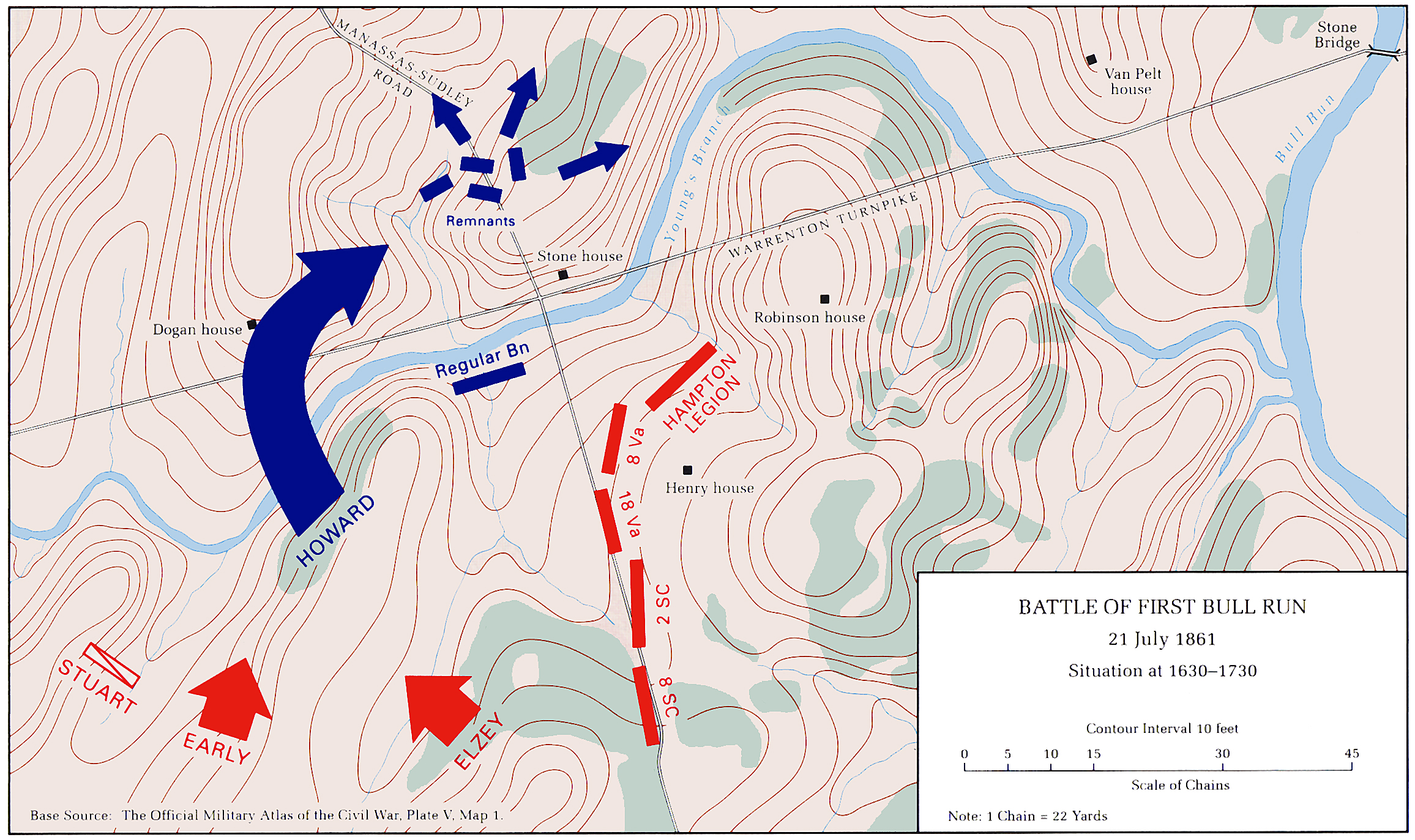
Map 12:
Situation at 16:30–17:30
(July 21, 1861)

== In popular culture ==
The First Battle of Bull Run is mentioned in the novel Gods and Generals, but is depicted more fully in its film adaptation. The battle forms the climax of the film Class of '61. It also appears in the first episode of the second season of the mini-series North and South, in the second episode of the first season of the mini-series How the West Was Won and in the first episode of the mini-series The Blue and the Gray. Manassas (1999) is the first volume in the James Reasoner Civil War Series of historical novels. The battle is described in Rebel (1993), the first volume of Bernard Cornwell's The Starbuck Chronicles series of historical novels. The battle is described from the viewpoint of a Union infantryman in Upton Sinclair's novella Manassas, which also depicts the political turmoil leading up to the Civil War. The battle is also depicted in John Jakes's The Titans, the fifth novel in The Kent Family Chronicles, a series that explores the fictional Confederate cavalry officer Gideon Kent. The battle is the subject of the Johnny Horton song, "Battle of Bull Run". Shaman, second in the Cole family trilogy by Noah Gordon, includes an account of the battle. The battle is also depicted in the song "Yankee Bayonet" by indie-folk band The Decemberists. In Murder at 1600, Detective Harlan Regis (Wesley Snipes) has built a plan-relief of the battle which plays a certain role in the plot.

== Sesquicentennial ==
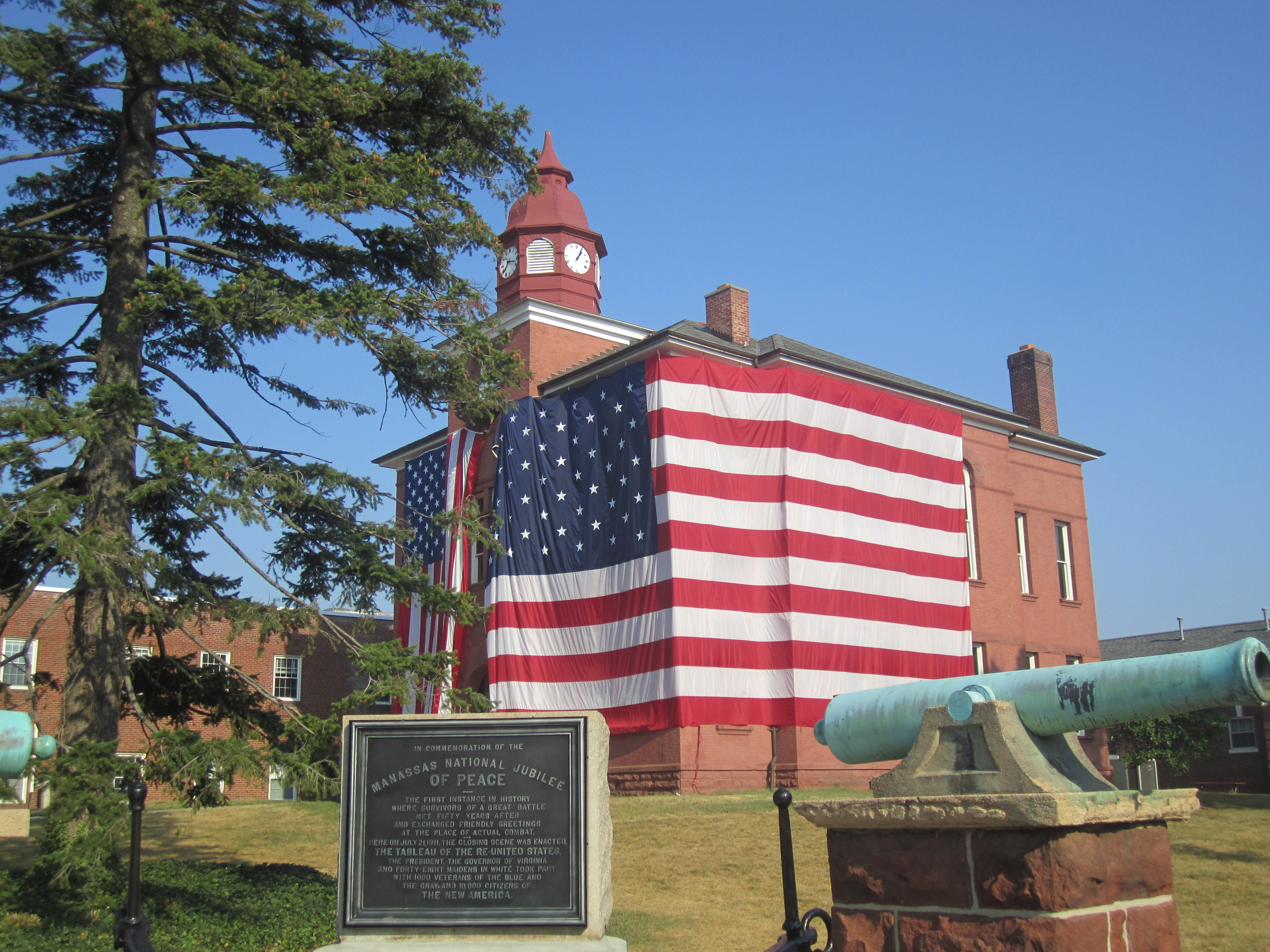
The National Jubilee of Peace building at Grant and Lee avenues in Manassas, Virginia, is draped with the U.S. flag for the 150th anniversary commemoration, held on July 21, 2011, of the First Battle of Bull Run.

Prince William County staged special events commemorating the 150th anniversary of the Civil War through 2011. Manassas was named the No. 1 tourist destination in the United States for 2011 by the American Bus Association for its efforts in highlighting the historical impact of the Civil War. The cornerstone of the commemoration event featured a reenactment of the battle on July 23–24, 2011. Throughout the year, there were tours of the Manassas battlefield and other battlefields in the county and a number of related events and activities.

The City of Manassas commemorated the 150th anniversary of the battle July 21–24, 2011.

== Battlefield preservation ==
Part of the site of the battle is now Manassas National Battlefield Park, which is designated as a National Battlefield Park. More than 900,000 people visit the battlefield each year. As a historic area under the National Park Service, the park was administratively listed on the National Register of Historic Places on October 15, 1966. The American Battlefield Trust and its partners have preserved more than 385 acres of the battlefields at Manassas in 15 transactions since 2010, mostly on the Second Manassas Battlefield.

== See also ==
- Armies in the American Civil War
- Troop engagements of the American Civil War, 1861
- List of costliest American Civil War land battles
- Origins of the American Civil War
- Bull Run Mountains
- Commemoration of the American Civil War on postage stamps
