= National Register of Historic Places listings in Powhatan County, Virginia =

Location of Powhatan County in Virginia

This is a list of the National Register of Historic Places listings in Powhatan County, Virginia.

This is intended to be a complete list of the properties and districts on the National Register of Historic Places in Powhatan County, Virginia, United States. The locations of National Register properties and districts for which the latitude and longitude coordinates are included below, may be seen in an online map.

There are 21 properties and districts listed on the National Register in the county.

This National Park Service list is complete through NPS recent listings posted March 6, 2026.

== Current listings ==
	Name on the Register	Image	Date listed	Location	City or town	Description
1	Beaumont	Beaumont	April 2, 1987 (#87000571)	State Route 313; 37°40′05″N 77°54′46″W	Michaux	
2	Belmead	Belmead	November 12, 1969 (#69000270)	Northwest of the junction of Belmead Rd. and St. Emma Dr.; also 5004 Cartersville Rd. 37°37′15″N 77°59′32″W	Powhatan	Second set of addresses represent a boundary increase approved April 14, 2025.
3	Belnemus	Belnemus	April 20, 1979 (#79003069)	West of Powhatan off U.S. Route 60; 37°34′04″N 77°59′44″W	Powhatan	
4	Blenheim	Blenheim	December 11, 1986 (#86003475)	6177 Blenheim Rd. 37°30′50″N 78°05′03″W	Ballsville	
5	Elmington	Elmington	January 20, 2005 (#04001538)	3277 Maidens Rd. 37°36′25″N 77°55′48″W	Powhatan	
6	Emmanuel Episcopal Church	Emmanuel Episcopal Church	December 27, 1990 (#90001924)	Emmanuel Church Rd., south of U.S. Route 60; 37°33′05″N 77°56′34″W	Powhatan	
7	Fighting Creek Plantation	Fighting Creek Plantation	December 3, 2013 (#13000890)	1811 Mill Quarter Rd. 37°31′00″N 77°55′55″W	Powhatan	
8	Fine Creek Mills Historic District	Fine Creek Mills Historic District	January 16, 2004 (#03001440)	2425-2434 Robert E. Lee Rd. 37°35′59″N 77°49′04″W	Fine Creek Mills	
9	French's Tavern	French's Tavern	April 21, 1989 (#89000293)	6100 State Route 13; 37°29′24″N 78°04′48″W	Ballsville	
10	Huguenot Memorial Chapel and Monument	Huguenot Memorial Chapel and Monument	March 23, 1988 (#88000214)	Huguenot Trail; 37°33′53″N 77°42′33″W	Manakin	
11	Keswick	Keswick	December 19, 1974 (#74002144)	Northeast of Powhatan off Huguenot Trail; 37°33′25″N 77°39′59″W	Powhatan	
12	Mosby Tavern		April 11, 2003 (#03000214)	2625 Old Tavern Rd. 37°33′55″N 78°02′13″W	Powhatan	
13	Norwood	Norwood	May 19, 1980 (#80004212)	Northeast of Powhatan off Huguenot Trail; 37°35′04″N 77°44′35″W	Powhatan	
14	Paxton	Paxton	December 28, 1990 (#90001987)	3032 Genito Rd. 37°27′47″N 77°51′33″W	Powhatan	
15	Powhatan Courthouse Historic District	Powhatan Courthouse Historic District	February 16, 1970 (#70000821)	Junction of State Routes 13 and 300; 37°32′30″N 77°55′06″W	Powhatan	
16	Provost	Provost	December 22, 1999 (#99001603)	4801 Cartersville Rd. 37°36′19″N 77°59′01″W	Powhatan	
17	Red Lane Tavern	Red Lane Tavern	January 24, 2002 (#01001516)	3009 Lower Hill Rd. 37°31′47″N 77°51′28″W	Powhatan	
18	Rosemont	Rosemont	May 29, 2008 (#08000482)	4747 Cosby Rd. 37°36′20″N 77°58′55″W	Powhatan	
19	St. Luke's Episcopal Church	St. Luke's Episcopal Church	March 29, 1989 (#89000193)	2245 Huguenot Trail; 37°35′39″N 77°48′01″W	Fine Creek Mills	
20	Somerset	Somerset	September 6, 2006 (#06000804)	2310 Ballsville Rd. 37°32′50″N 78°05′20″W	Powhatan	
21	Sublett's Tavern		May 6, 2025 (#100011798)	1652 Huguenot Trail; 37°35′24″N 77°45′24″W	Powhatan	

== See also ==
- List of National Historic Landmarks in Virginia
- National Register of Historic Places listings in Virginia
