= Taverns in North America =

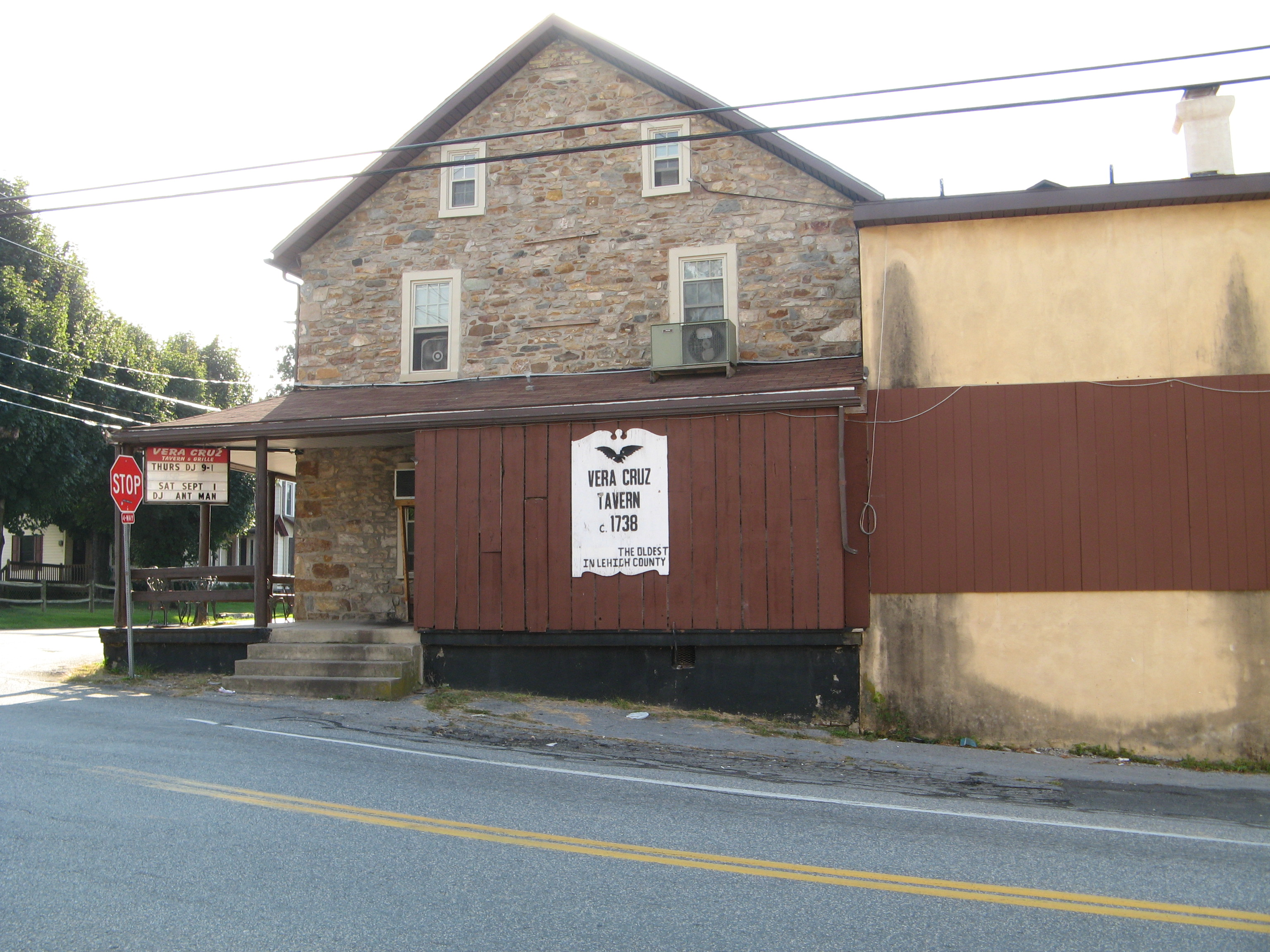
The Vera Cruz Tavern in Vera Cruz, Pennsylvania

Taverns in North America date back to colonial America. Colonial Americans drank a variety of distilled spirits. As the supply of distilled spirits, especially rum, increased, and their price dropped, they became the drink of choice throughout the colonies. In 1770, per capita consumption was 3.7 gallons of distilled spirits per year, rising to 5.2 gallons in 1830 or approximately 1.8 one-ounce shots a day for every adult white man. That total does not include the beer or hard cider, which colonists routinely drank in addition to rum, the most consumed distilled beverage available in British America. Benjamin Franklin printed a "Drinker's Dictionary" in his Pennsylvania Gazette in 1737, listing some 228 slang terms used for drunkenness in Philadelphia.

The sheer volume of hard liquor consumption fell off, but the brewing of beer increased, and men developed customs and traditions based on how to behave at the tavern. By 1900, the 26 million American men over age 18 patronized 215,000 licensed taverns and probably 50,000 unlicensed (illegal) ones, or one per 100 men. Twice the density could be found in working class neighborhoods. They served mostly beer; bottles were available, but most drinkers went to the taverns. Probably half of the American men avoided saloons and so the average consumption for actual patrons was about half-a-gallon of beer per day, six days a week. In 1900, the city of Boston, with about 200,000 adult men, counted 227,000 daily saloon customers.

== Colonial America to 1800 ==
Taverns in the colonies closely followed the ordinaries of the mother country. Taverns, along with inns, at first were mostly known as ordinaries, which were constructed throughout most of New England. These institutions were influential in the development of new settlements, serving as gathering spaces for the community. Taverns here though served many purposes such as courtrooms, religious meetings, trading posts, inns, post offices, and convenience stores. The taverns in the North and the South were different in their uses as well unlike the central ideal tavern in England. The ones in the South that are closer to the frontier were used as inns and trading post from those who were headed into the unknown lands to settle. The multiple functions of public houses were especially important in frontier communities in which other institutions were often weak, which was certainly true on the southern colonial frontier. They were supervised by county officials, who recognized the need for taverns and the need to maintain order, to minimize drunkenness and avoid it on Sundays if possible, and to establish the responsibilities of tavern keepers. With those profits came progress, which improved the new homelands with the use of taverns as well as breweries. The original structure of these taverns were log cabins, typically a storey and a half high with two rooms on each floor. The ground floor could be used by the public, and the upper floor had the bedrooms and was somewhat removed from the public.

=== Earliest hotels ===
Larger taverns provided rooms for travelers, especially in county seats that housed the county court. Upscale taverns had a lounge with a huge fireplace, a bar at one side, plenty of benches and chairs, and several dining tables. The best houses had a separate parlor for ladies because the other part was unclean, as well as an affable landlord, good cooking, soft, roomy beds, fires in all rooms in cold weather, and warming pans used on the beds at night. In the backwoods, the taverns were wretched hovels, dirty with vermin for company; even so, they were safer and more pleasant for the stranger than camping by the roadside. Even on main highways such as the Boston Post Road, travelers routinely reported the taverns had bad food, hard beds, scanty blankets, inadequate heat, and poor service. One Sunday in 1789, President George Washington, who was touring Connecticut, discovered that the locals discouraged travel on the Sabbath and so he spent the day at Perkins Tavern, "which by the way is not a good one."

=== Locals ===
Taverns were essential for colonial Americans, especially in the rural South, where colonists learned current crop prices, engaged in trade, and heard newspapers read aloud. For most rural Americans, the tavern was the chief link to the greater world and played a role much like the city marketplace of medieval Europe.

Taverns absorbed leisure hours, and games were provided. Horse races often began and ended at taverns, as did militia-training exercises. Cockfights were common. At upscale taverns, the gentry had private rooms or even organized a club. When politics was in season or the county court was meeting, political talk filled the taverns.

Taverns served multiple functions on the Southern colonial frontier. Society in Rowan County, North Carolina, was divided along lines of ethnicity, gender, race, and class, but in taverns, the boundaries often overlapped, as diverse groups were brought together at nearby tables. Consumerism in the backcountry was limited not by ideology or culture but by distance from markets and poor transportation. The increasing variety of drinks served and the development of clubs indicates that genteel culture spread rapidly from London to the periphery of the English world.

=== Business ===
In the colonial era, in certain areas, up to 40 percent of taverns were operated by women, especially widows. Local magistrates, who had to award a license before a tavern could operate, preferred widows who knew the business and might otherwise be impoverished and become a charge to the county. The main reason was that taverns started to become upper-class establishments, which called for more experienced proprietors. Only licensed ordinaries, though, were usually allowed to sell alcohol for consumption with fixed measures for fixed prices. Women and children were not usually welcome as fellow drinkers. In some instances, women and children were welcome in taverns but it was mostly a place reserved for men. If women were found in a tavern, they were typically considered prostitutes. Women would come into taverns to look for their husbands or would come with their fathers or brothers; otherwise, women were not allowed. The drinkers were men, and indeed, they often defined their manliness by how much alcohol they could drink at a time. The public held standards like keeping an orderly house, selling at prices according to the law, and not slandering other tavern keepers to avoid bad reputations.

== Meeting place and community center ==
In rural communities, the tavern was a very important public space since it offered the community a place not only to meet but also to conduct business. The tavern also acted as an impromptu court house, where rules could be made, and disputes could be settled. From 1660 to 1665, the Virginia government met in Jamestown at the local taverns. From 1749 to 1779, the Mosby Tavern was the courthouse, jail, and militia rendezvous for Cumberland County, Virginia and later for Powhatan County, Virginia. Gifford Dalley managed City Tavern in Philadelphia, which served as an unofficial meeting place for the First Continental Congress, and in documents, he served as the Keeper of the Door for the First, Second, and Third United States Congresses. Dalley's brother-in-law, John Simmons, owned Simmons' Tavern in New York City, where New York's City Mayor James Duane was sworn into office while City Hall was being refurbished after the Revolutionary War. The last time Congress met at a tavern it was at Fraunces Tavern. The Tun Tavern in Philadelphia is regarded as the place where the U.S. Marines were first recruited. Neither place still exists, but a reconstruction of City Tavern in Philadelphia still operates.

== Mail stop and post office ==
Many were also the local post office and or the polling place. The United States Postal Service had its origins in the private taverns and coffeehouses of America.

A depiction of Civil War troops reading their mail at the Eagle Tavern which doubled as the post office in Silver Spring, Maryland can be seen at the Silver Spring Library. The Old Post Office Tavern is in operation today in Leavenworth, Washington. Old Kelley's Tavern in New Hampshire is a multifunctional tavern. Colonel William B. Kelley of New Hampshire operated a tavern and was the Postmaster General for New Hampshire. The mail came and went from his home. The Hanover Tavern in Hanover County, Virginia is another tavern which also operated as the post office. The General Wayne Inn in Lower Merion Pennsylvania also served as a post office from 1830 to 1850 and was also the polling place in 1806.

== Oldest taverns ==
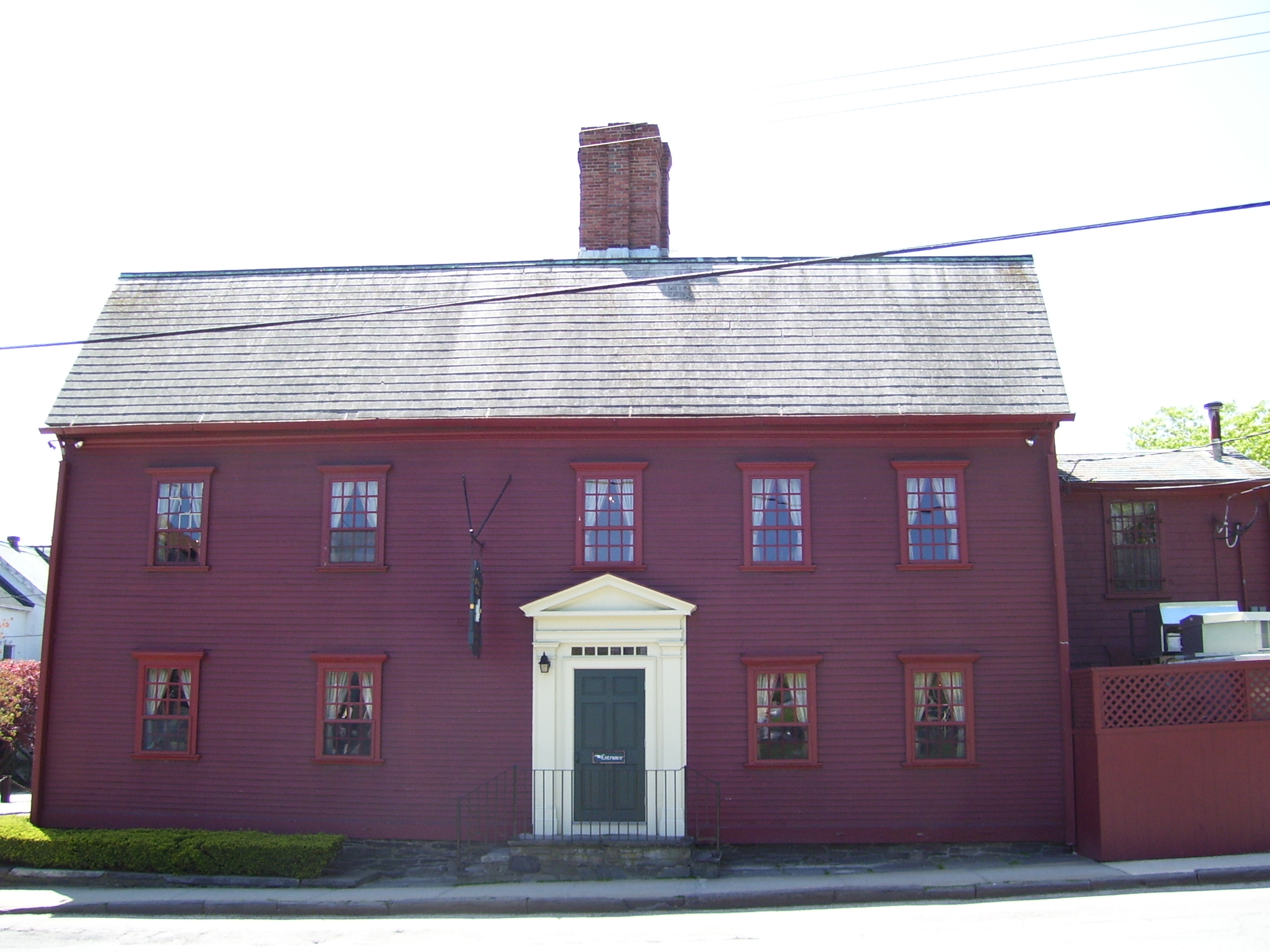
The historic White Horse Tavern in Newport, Rhode Island, in the United States

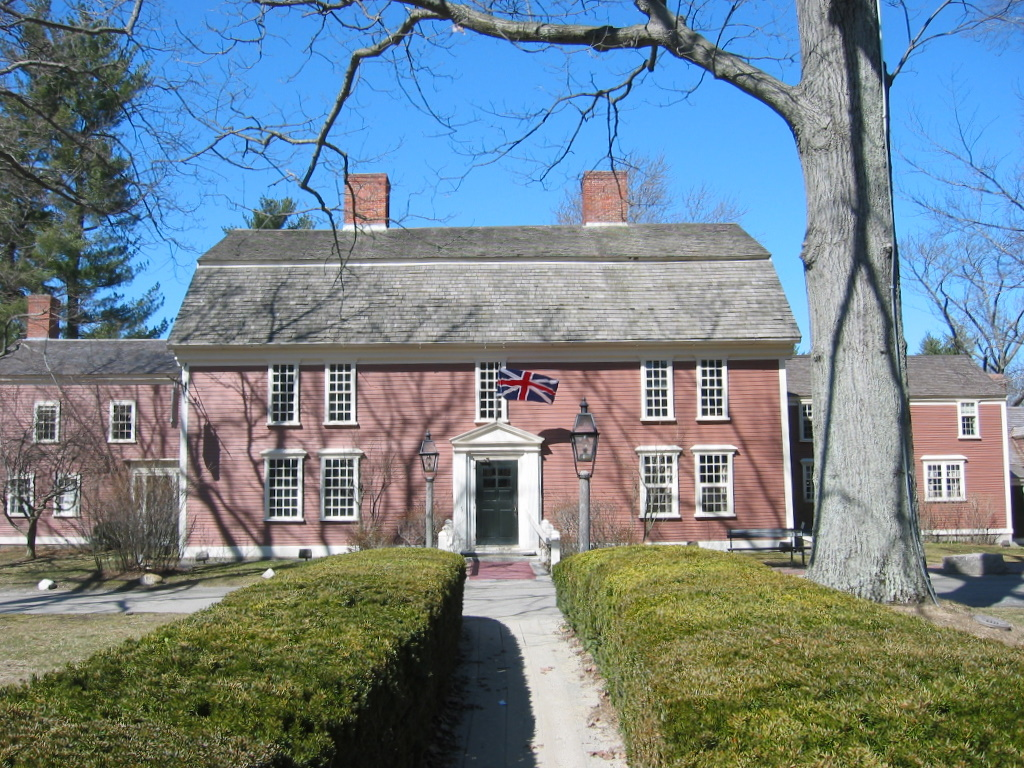
The Wayside Inn in Sudbury, Massachusetts

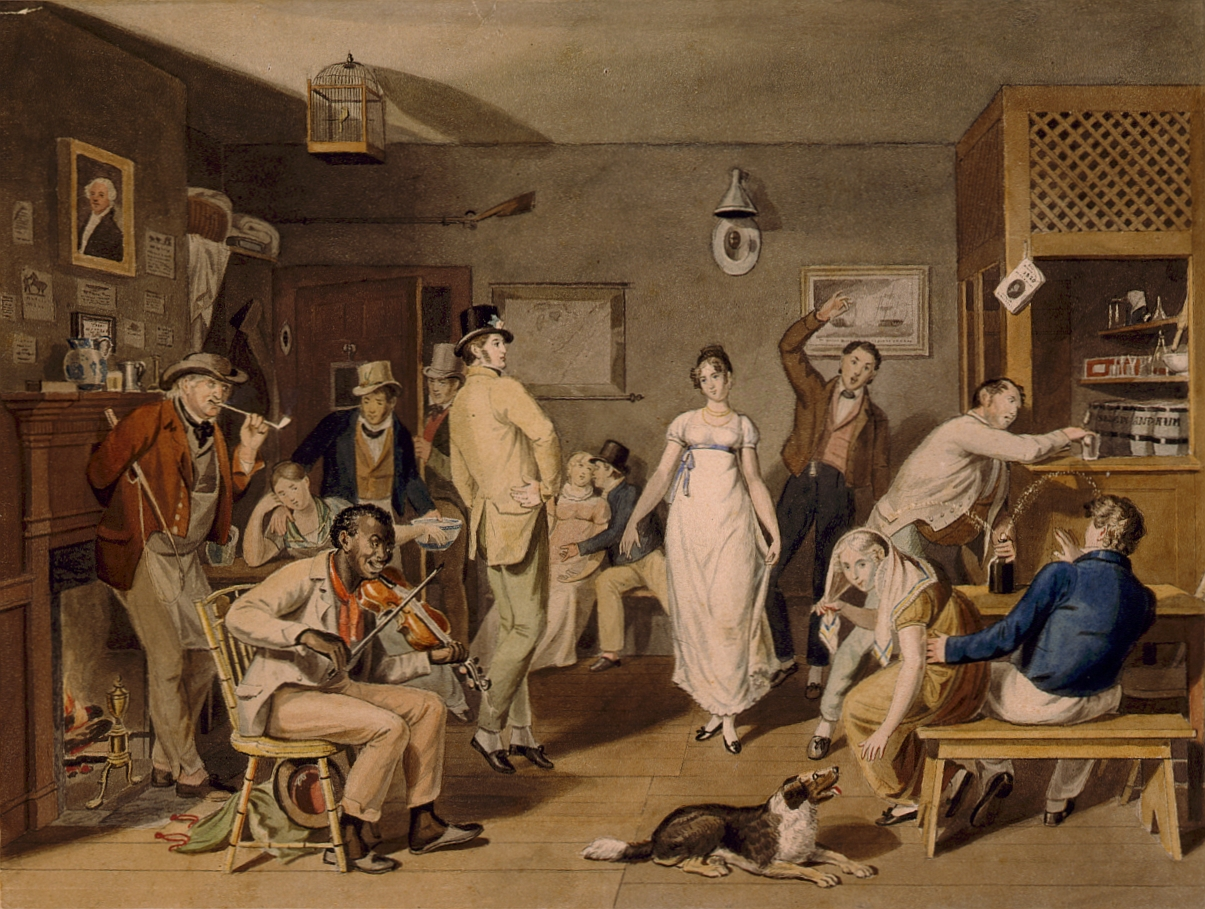
Barroom Dancing, c. 1820, by John Lewis Krimmel

The oldest tavern is a distinction claimed by numerous establishments. Some establishments clarify their claims with oldest continuously operating tavern, oldest family-owned tavern, oldest drinking establishment, or oldest licensed since there are many ways to distinguish the oldest tavern. The first tavern in Boston, Massachusetts, was a Puritan ordinary, opened on March 4, 1633. That date would have been given under the Julian Calendar, which was in use by England and its colonies at the time.

The White Horse Tavern, in Newport, Rhode Island, is most likely the tavern housed in the oldest building {built 1683; licensed 1687}. The Blue Anchor, the first drinking establishment at Front and Dock Streets in Philadelphia, began operation in 1681. Jean Lafitte's Black Smith Shoppe, in New Orleans, Louisiana is claimed by some to be the oldest bar that continuously operated before 1775. Lafitte himself was born in 1776. The Wayside Inn, in Sudbury, Massachusetts, is reputedly the oldest operating inn in America and goes back to 1716.

== Germania (German-America) ==
German immigrants to the United States, who introduced lager beer to the United States, also introduced beer gardens (often attached to breweries) to the U.S. in the mid-19th century. The Schlitz Palm Gardens and Pabst Park beer gardens, in Milwaukee, Wisconsin, are regarded as precursors to modern theme parks.

Germans operated nearly all of the nation's breweries, with a high demand, until prohibition arrived in 1920. German-American newspapers promoted temperance but not abstinence. From the German perspective, the issue was less the ill effects of alcohol than its benefits in promoting social life. For German-Americans, the beer garden stood as one of the two pillars of German social and spiritual life, alongside the church.

== New York City ==
Perhaps the most famous American tavern is Fraunces Tavern, at the corner of Broad and Pearl Streets, in Lower Manhattan. Originally built as a residence in 1719, it was opened as a tavern by Samuel Fraunces in 1762, and became a much used gathering place. Fraunces Tavern was the site of merchants' meetings on the post-1763 taxes, plots by the Sons of Liberty, and entertainments for British and Loyalist officers during the American Revolution. In its Long Room, on December 4, 1783, General George Washington said farewell to his officers and family.

== New England ==
The heavy Puritan heritage of New England meant that local government was strong enough to regulate and close rowdy places. However, the power of ministers faded, and by the 1690s, provincial leaders had recognized that they could not eradicate hard drinking in taverns. From then to after the American Revolution, the tavern was a widely accepted institution in Massachusetts.

Between 1697 and 1756 Elizabeth Harvey, followed by her daughter-in-law, Ann Harvey Slayton, operated a successful tavern in Portsmouth, New Hampshire. Their careers reveal the public acceptance of female management and authority within the confines of the tavern. Under Harvey, the tavern became a mail stop and began hosting General Assembly and executive committee meetings. After Slayton took over, the tavern held town meetings; supplied necessities to the poor for which the town gave reimbursement; and provided accommodations for the provincial government, courts, and legislative committees.

== Frontier of colonial North Carolina ==
In colonial North Carolina, taverns had multiple functions. In addition to their functions as accommodation for travelers and as places for eating and drinking, taverns served as places for commerce, informal political discussion, and the spread of news and information. From 1753 to 1776, the number of taverns operating in the frontier county of Rowan County, North Carolina in an average year was "probably closer to forty than ten," based on taxation and licensure records. Overall, distilled spirits such as whiskey, rum, and brandy, were more common than beer. Research shows that the consumption of alcohol varied by place based on the ethnic composition of the tavern's customers: "The more Scottish a tavern's clientele the more spirits served, and the more German or English its patrons the more beer served."

Women were underrepresented as both patrons and operators of colonial North Carolina taverns. That may be partially attributable to the demographics of frontier settlements, which were skewed male.

== Ethnic saloons ==
In ethnic neighborhoods of cities, mill towns, and mining camps, the saloonkeeper was an important man. Groups of 25–50 recent arrivals speaking the same language and probably also from the same province or village back in Europe drank together and frequented the same saloon. They trusted the saloonkeeper to translate and write letters for them, help with transatlantic letters and remittances, keep their savings for them, and explain American laws and customs.

== Speakeasies ==
Speakeasies, or "blind pigs," were illegal bars and became extremely common during Prohibition (1920–1933). The term "speakeasy" entered the vernacular in Pennsylvania in the late 1880s as illegal saloons flourished when the cost of legal liquor licenses was raised under the Brooks High License law. Most taverns closed up, but drinkers found out-of-the-way speakeasies that would serve them. The owners had to buy illegal beer and liquor from criminal syndicates (the most famous was run by Al Capone in Chicago) and had to pay off the police to look the other way. The result was an overall decrease in drinking and an enormous increase in organized crime, gang warfare, and civic corruption, as well as a decline in tax revenue. Prohibition was repealed in 1933, and legitimate places reopened.

== Canada ==
Roberts (2008) shows that in Upper Canada (now Ontario) in the early 19th century, there was an informal ritual at work that tavern keepers and patrons followed. For example, the barrooms were reserved for men, but adjacent rooms were places in which women could meet, families could come, and female sociability flourished. Meanwhile, the local men and the visitors, such as travelers, doctors, tradespeople, and artists, could express their views on topics of general interest.

Occasionally, heated arguments would break into fights between religious or ethnic groups. Despite efforts by social reformers to regulate taverns in Ontario, physical violence linked to drinking was common. Indeed, 19th-century masculinity, derived from earlier models of fur traders in the region, was often predicated on feats of strength and stamina and on skill in fighting. Taverns were the most common public gathering place for males of the working class and thus the site of frequent confrontations. Men's honour and men's bodies, which were socially and historically linked, found public and often destructive expression in the tavern setting.

The term "tavern" was regularly used in Ontario until the mid-1980s, when it disappeared and has been replaced with "bar" for almost any restaurant type of facility that sells alcohol.

== Mexico ==
Reformers in Mexico who denounced the terrible effects of heavy consumption of alcohol on public disorder, health, and quality of work made periodic attempts to control it in Mexico City in the late 18th century and the early 19th century. The poor frequented the pulquerías, where pulque, made from the maguey plant, was sold. After the legalization of the more potent aguardiente in 1796, the poor could also afford the viñaterías, where hard liquor was served, and drunkenness increased. The taverns played an important social and recreational role in the lives of the poor. Influential citizens often owned the pulcherías and opposed reform, as did owners of the maguey haciendas. Tax revenues from alcohol were important to the government. Those factors, as well the lax enforcement of the laws, resulted in the failure of tavern reform.

== Bibliography ==
- Conroy, David W. In Public Houses: Drink and the Revolution of Authority in Colonial Massachusetts (1995)
- Duis, Perry. The saloon: public drinking in Chicago and Boston, 1880–1920? (1975) 416 pages; wide-ranging scholarly history excerpt and text search
- Earle, Alice Morse. Stage-coach and tavern days (1922), heavily illustrated full text online at Google
- Gottlieb, David. "The Neighborhood Tavern and the Cocktail Lounge a Study of Class Differences". American Journal of Sociology, Vol. 62, No. 6 (May, 1957), pp. 559–562 in JSTOR, Chicago in 1950s
- Gusfield, Joseph R. "Passage To Play: Rituals of Drinking Time in American Society", in Constructive Drinking: Perspectives on Drink from Anthropology, ed. Mary Douglas (1987), 73–90.
- Heron, Craig. Booze: A Distilled History (2003), on Canada
- Kingsdale, Jon M. "The 'Poor Man's Club': Social Functions of the Urban Working-Class Saloon", American Quarterly, Vol. 25, No. 4 (Oct., 1973), pp. 472–489 in JSTOR
- Lemasters, E. E. Blue-Collar Aristocrats: Life-Styles at a Working Class Tavern. (1975) in Wisconsin in the 1970s.
- Lender, Mark Edward, and James Kirby Martin. Drinking in America: A History (1982).
- McBurney, Margaret and Byers, Mary. Tavern in the Town: Early Inns and Taverns of Ontario. (1987). 259 pp.
- Mancall, Peter C. "'The Art Of Getting Drunk' in Colonial Massachusetts". Reviews in American History 1996 24(3): 383–388. 0048–7511 in Project MUSE
- Meacham, Sarah Hand. "Keeping the Trade: The Persistence of Tavernkeeping among Middling Women in Colonial Virginia", Early American Studies, Volume 3, Number 1, Spring 2005, pp. 140–163 in Project MUSE
- Murphy, Kevin C. "Public Virtue, Public Vices: On Republicanism and the Tavern" (thesis Columbia University 2009) online edition
- Powers, Madelon. Faces along the Bar: Lore and Order in the Workingman's Saloon, 1870–1920 (1998)
- Rice, Kim. Early American Taverns: For the Entertainment of Friends and Strangers (1983)
- Roberts, Julia. In Mixed Company: Taverns and Public Life in Upper Canada (UBC Press, 2008). 228 pp. ISBN 978-0-7748-1575-8
- Rorabaugh, William J. The Alcoholic Republic: An American Tradition (1979)
- Rothbart, Ron. "The Ethnic Saloon as a Form of Immigrant Enterprise", International Migration Review, Vol. 27, No. 2 (Summer, 1993), pp. 332–358 in JSTOR, study of coal towns in 19c Pennsylvania
- Salinger, Sharon V. Taverns and Drinking in Early America (2002)
- Struzinski, Steven. "The Tavern in Colonial America", The Gettysburg Historical Journal, Vol. 1, No. 1 (2002), pp. 29–38. ISSN 2327-3917. Full text.
- Thompson, Peter. Rum Punch and Revolution: Taverngoing and Public Life in Eighteenth-Century Philadelphia (1999)
