= Genito, Virginia =

Unincorporated community in Virginia, US

Coordinates: 37°27′44″N 77°51′33″W

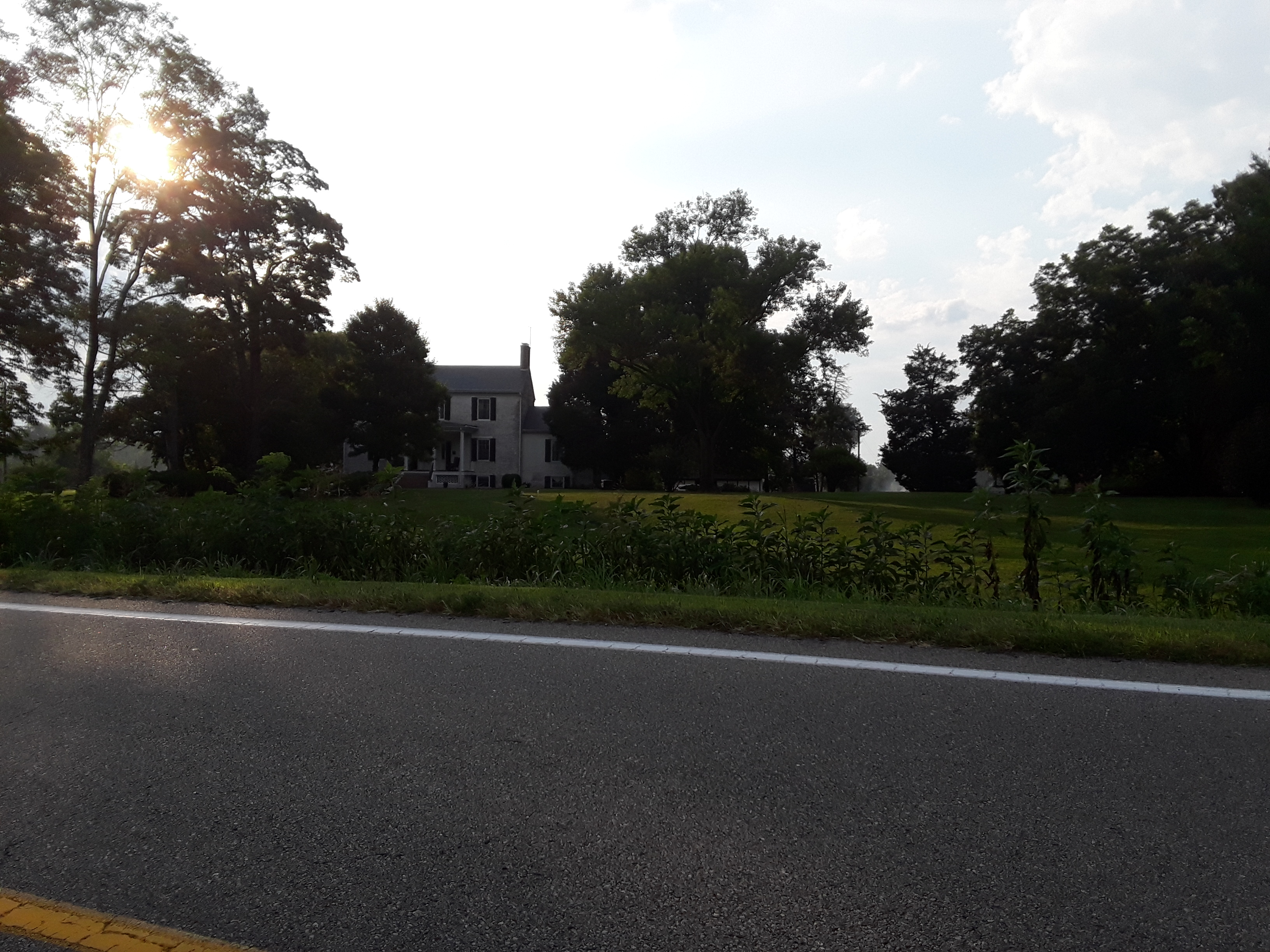
Paxton house and grounds in Genito, Virginia

Genito is an unincorporated community in Powhatan County, in the U.S. state of Virginia.
