= Keswick (Powhatan, Virginia) =

Historic house in Virginia, United States

- U.S. National Register of Historic Places
- Virginia Landmarks Register
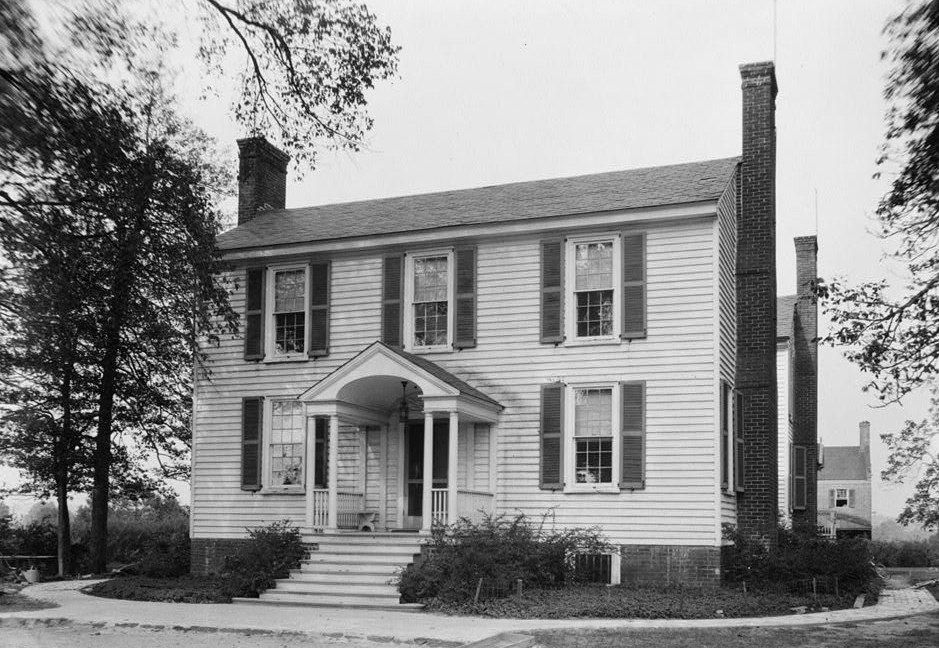
- Keswick, Main House, HABS Photo

- Location within Virginia Location within the United States
- Location: Northeast of Powhatan off VA 711, near Powhatan, Virginia
- Coordinates: 37°33′39″N 77°39′52″W
- Area: 183 acres (74 ha)
- Architectural style: H-shape
- NRHP reference No.: 74002144
- VLR No.: 072-0045

Significant dates
- Added to NRHP: December 19, 1974
- Designated VLR: November 19, 1974

Keswick is a historic plantation house near Powhatan, in Chesterfield County and Powhatan County, Virginia, US. It was built in the early-19th century, and is an H-shaped, two-story, gable-roofed, frame-with-weatherboard building. It is supported on brick foundations and has a brick exterior end chimney on each gable. Also on the property are a contributing well house, a smokehouse, the circular "slave quarters," a kitchen, a two-story brick house, a shed, and a laundry.

It was listed on the National Register of Historic Places in 1974.

== History ==
The builder and first owner of "Keswick" was Charles Clarke, who received a grant of 1,500 acres on the south bank of the James River in both Henrico and Goochland Counties (today Chesterfield and Powhatan Counties) sometime in the early eighteenth century. In the middle of the eighteenth century, Clarke married Marianne Salle (a member of one of the Huguenot families settled in Powhatan County). To house his new family, he built a residence known as the "Manor House." This house was small, as it only had two stories with two rooms on each floor. Charles Clarke died in the late eighteenth century and Keswick passed to his son, James, who at his death passed the property to his son John.

John Clarke built a new house that today is the main house at Keswick Plantation. It had an H-shape that paralleled Tuckahoe across the river.
