= Dorset, Virginia =

Unincorporated community in Virginia, US

Coordinates: 37°28′06″N 77°48′19″W

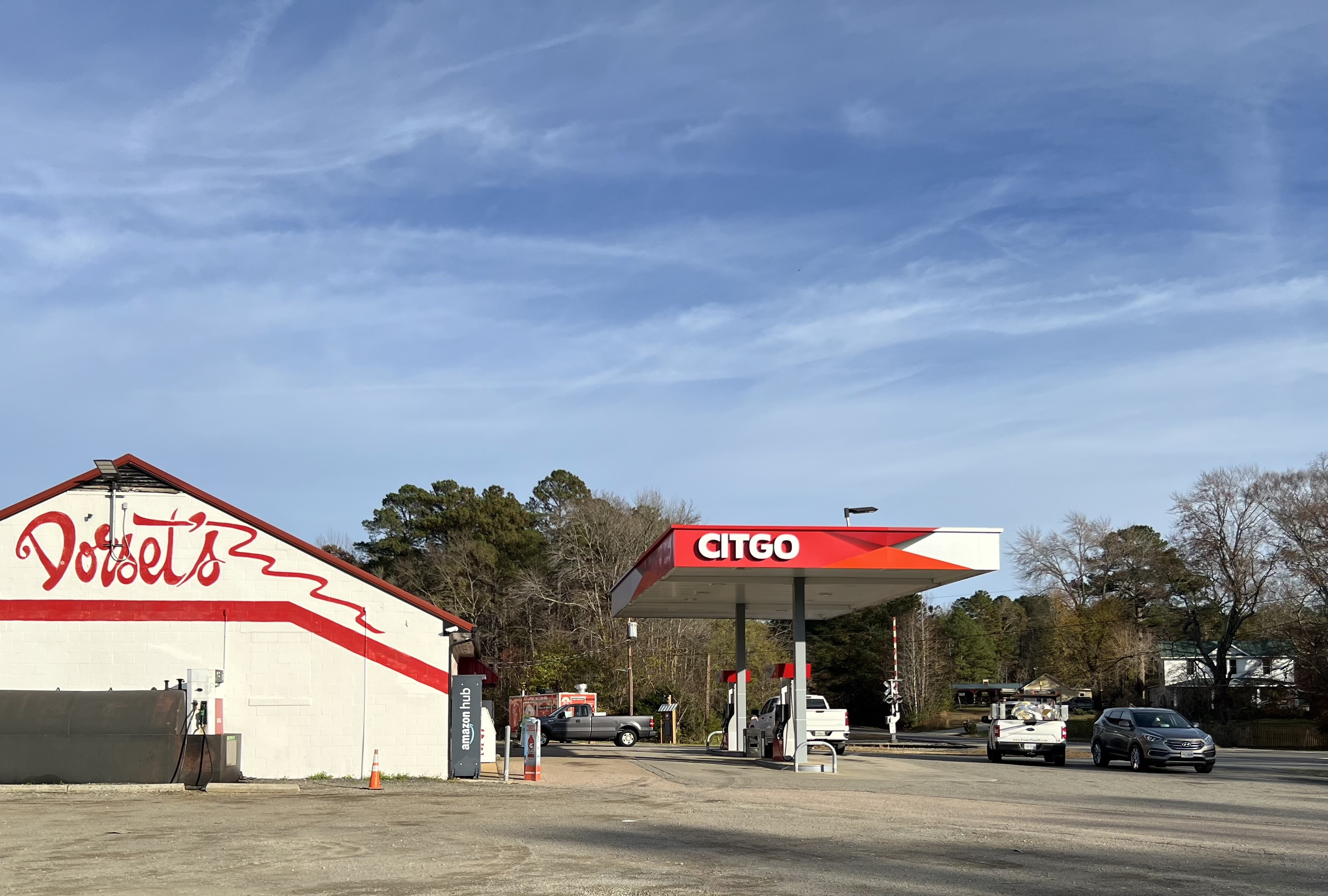
The Citgo station in Dorset.

Dorset is an unincorporated community in Powhatan County, in the U.S. state of Virginia.
