= Emmanuel Episcopal Church (Powhatan, Virginia) =

Historic church in Virginia, US

- U.S. National Register of Historic Places
- Virginia Landmarks Register
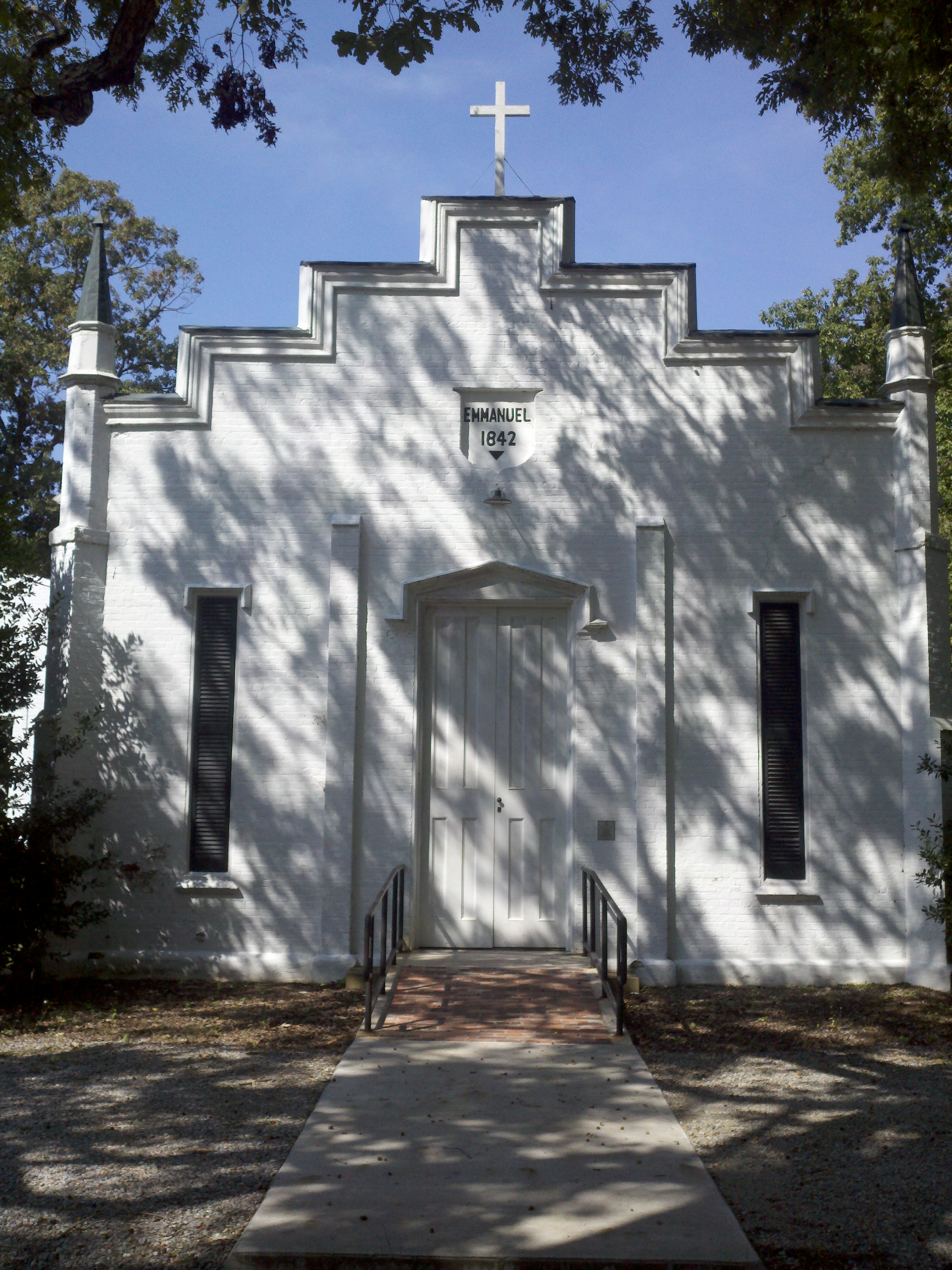
- Emmanuel Church, September 2012

- Location within Virginia Location within the United States
- Location: Emmanuel Church Rd. S of US 60, Powhatan, Virginia
- Coordinates: 37°33′36″N 77°57′17″W
- Area: 2 acres (0.81 ha)
- Architect: Davis, Alexander Jackson; Cocke, Gen. Philip St. George
- Architectural style: Gothic Revival, Vernacular Gothic Revival
- NRHP reference No.: 90001924
- VLR No.: 072-0013

Significant dates
- Added to NRHP: December 27, 1990
- Designated VLR: December 12, 1989

Emmanuel Episcopal Church is a historic Episcopal church located at Powhatan, Powhatan County, Virginia. It was built between 1842 and 1850, and is a one-story, vernacular Gothic Revival brick church building painted white. It features a stepped gable parapet, a half-octagonal apse which served as a vestry, and four tall window bays interspaced with slim buttresses. It also contains a cemetery in the back yard and north side of the church.

It was added to the National Register of Historic Places in 1990.
