= Clayville, Virginia =

Unincorporated community in Virginia, US

Coordinates: 37°27′36″N 77°49′01″W

Clayville is an unincorporated community in Powhatan County, in the U.S. state of Virginia.
