= Subletts, Virginia =

Unincorporated community in Virginia, US

Coordinates: 37°35′09″N 77°44′57″W

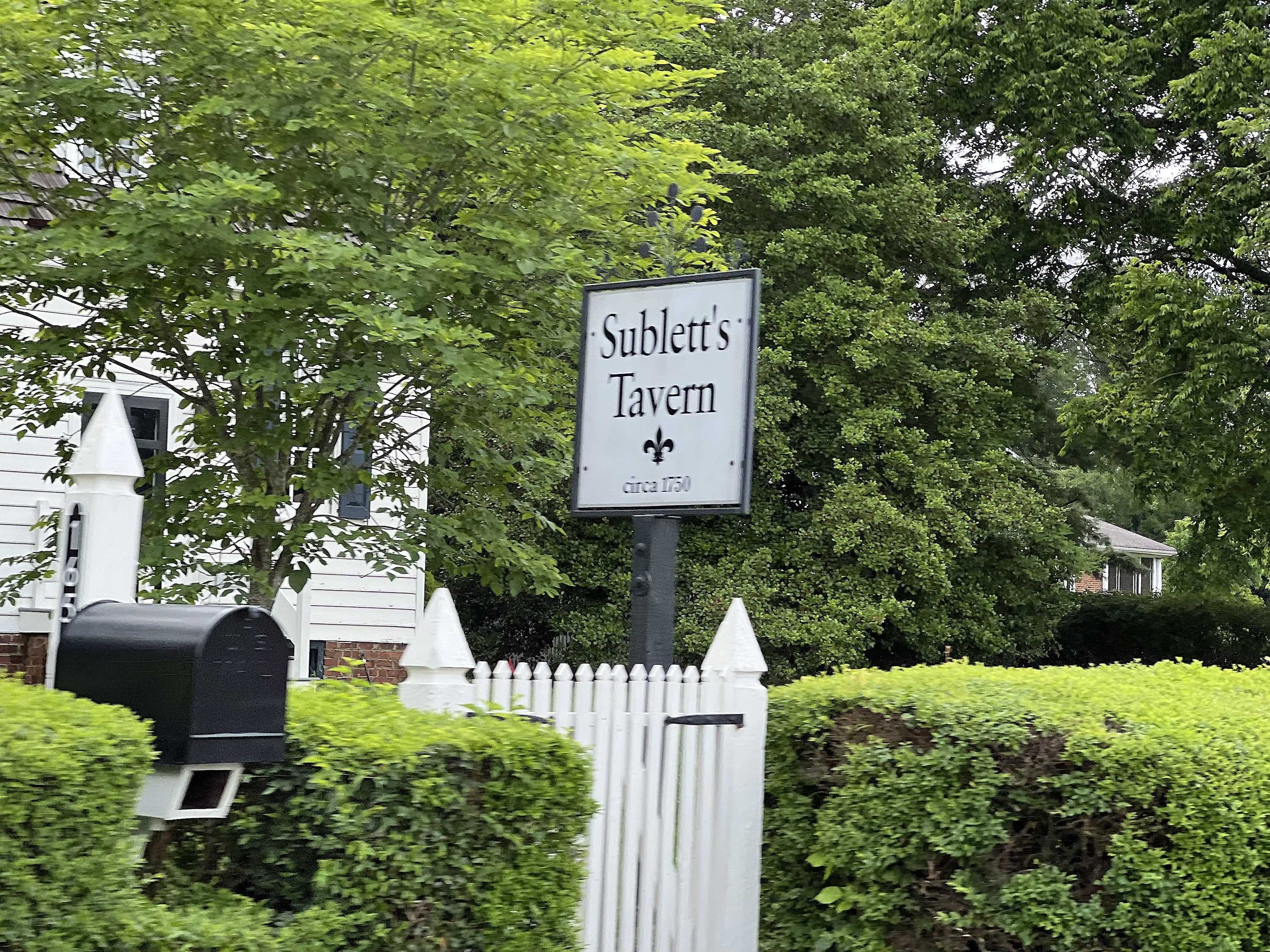
Sublett's Tavern in Subletts.

Subletts is an unincorporated community in Powhatan County, in the U.S. state of Virginia.
