= Fighting Creek Plantation =

Historic house in Virginia, United States

- U.S. National Register of Historic Places
- Virginia Landmarks Register
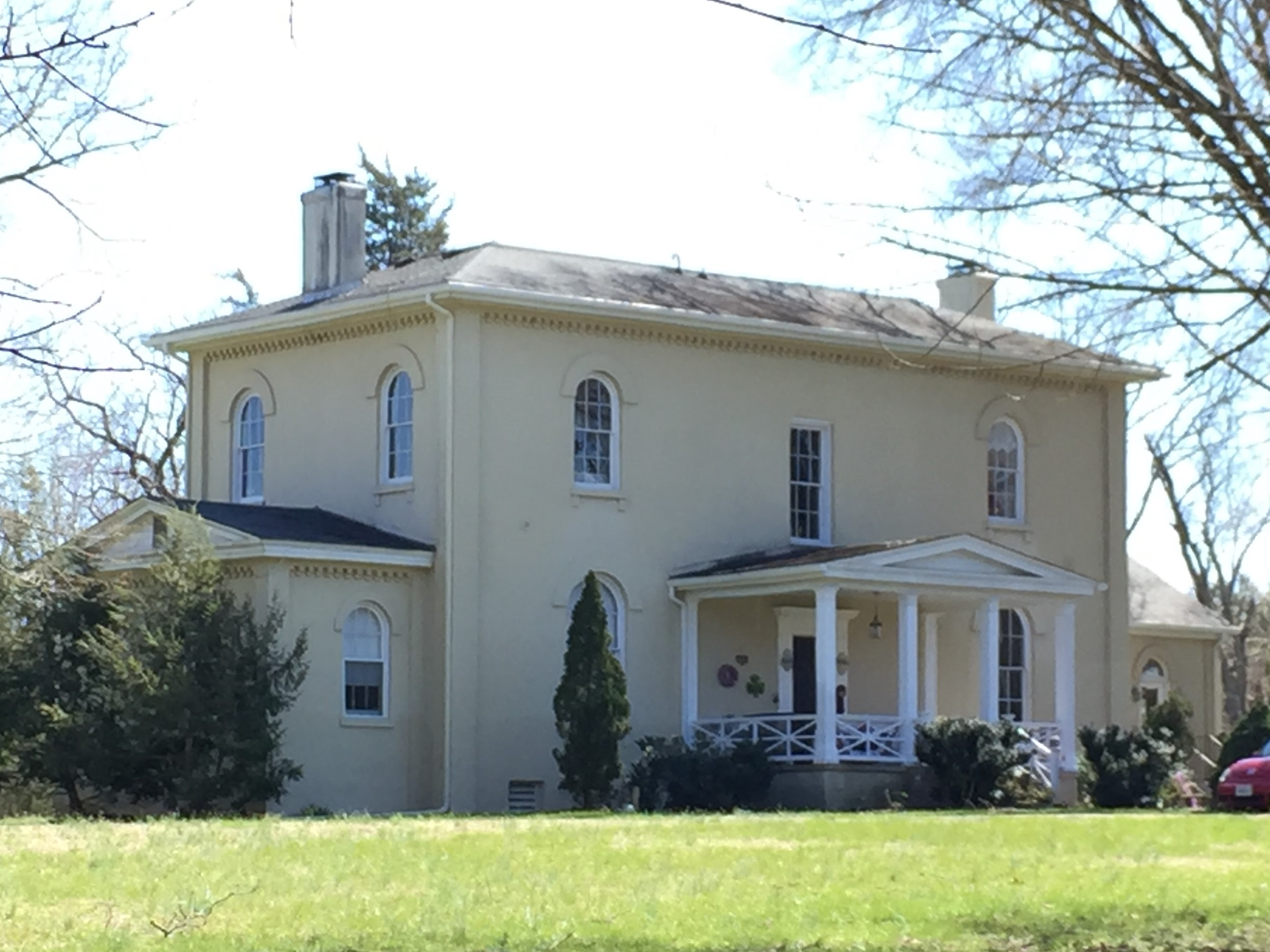
- Road entrance, 2018

- Location within Virginia Location within the United States
- Location: 1811 Mill Quarter Road, Powhatan, Virginia
- Coordinates: 37°31′06″N 77°54′48″W
- Area: 4.3 acres (1.7 ha)
- Built: 1841
- Architectural style: Italianate, Classical Revival
- NRHP reference No.: 13000890
- VLR No.: 072-0015

Significant dates
- Added to NRHP: December 3, 2013
- Designated VLR: September 19, 2013

The Fighting Creek Plantation is a historic plantation house at 1811 Mill Quarter Road in Powhatan, Virginia. It is one of a few surviving mid-19th century plantation houses in the state. The two story stucco manor house was built c. 1841, supposedly to a design by New York architect Alexander Jackson Davis. It was built for John Brockenbrough Harvie and his wife as the main house of their nearly 1,700-acre (690 ha) plantation. The property now associated with the house has been reduced to just 4.3 acres (1.7 ha). Its main facade features a two-story portico with square Doric columns, topped by a pedimented gable. On each level under the portico there is a door, with round-arch windows flanking it on either side.

The property was added to the National Register of Historic Places in 2013.

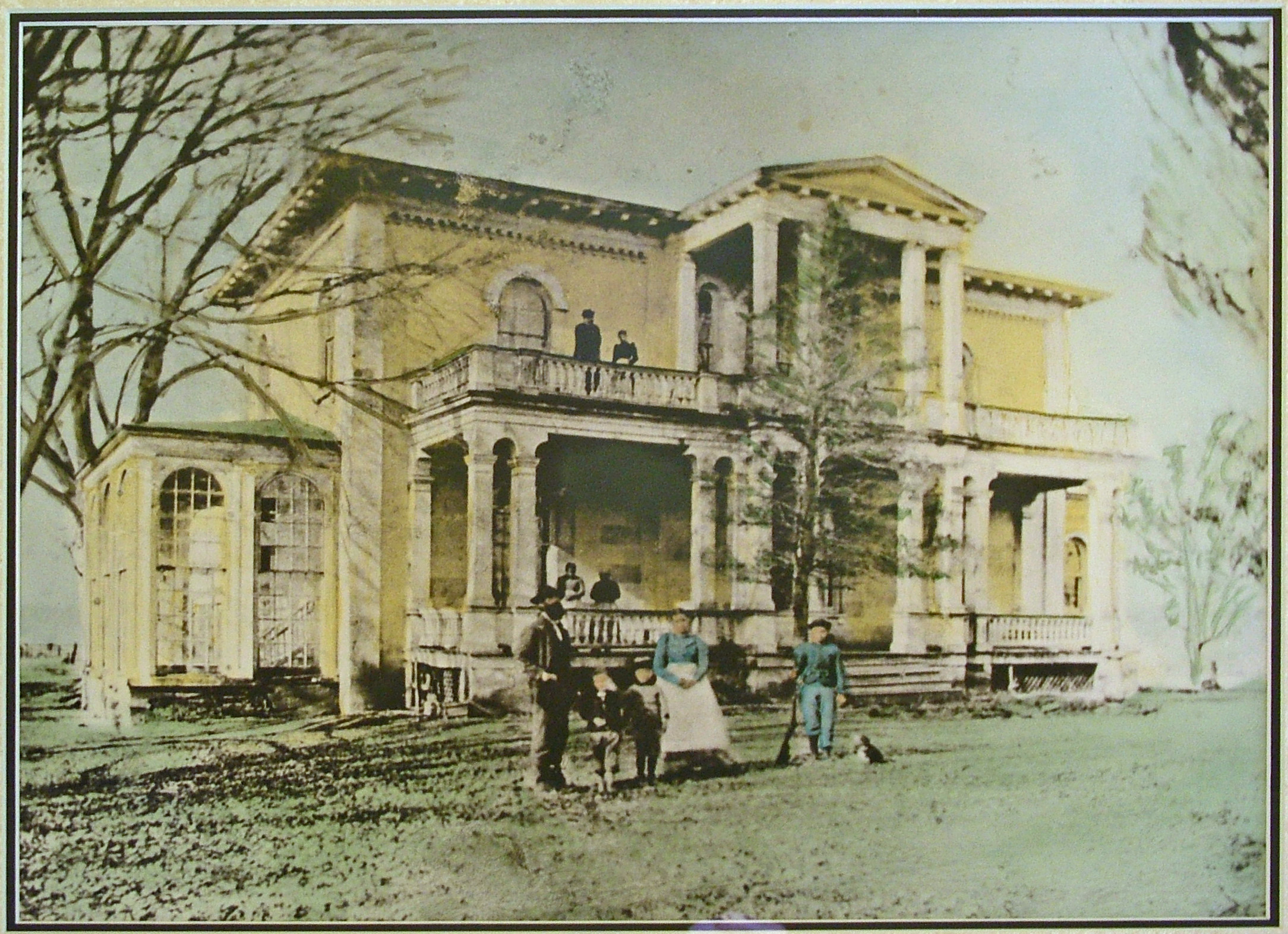
Colorized photo, c. 1890

== See also ==
- National Register of Historic Places listings in Powhatan County, Virginia
