= Smiths Crossroads, Virginia =

Unincorporated community in Virginia, US

Coordinates: 37.56626°N 78.01195°W

Smiths Crossroads is an unincorporated community in Powhatan County, in the U.S. state of Virginia.
