= Elmington (Powhatan, Virginia) =

Historic house in Virginia, United States

- U.S. National Register of Historic Places
- Virginia Landmarks Register
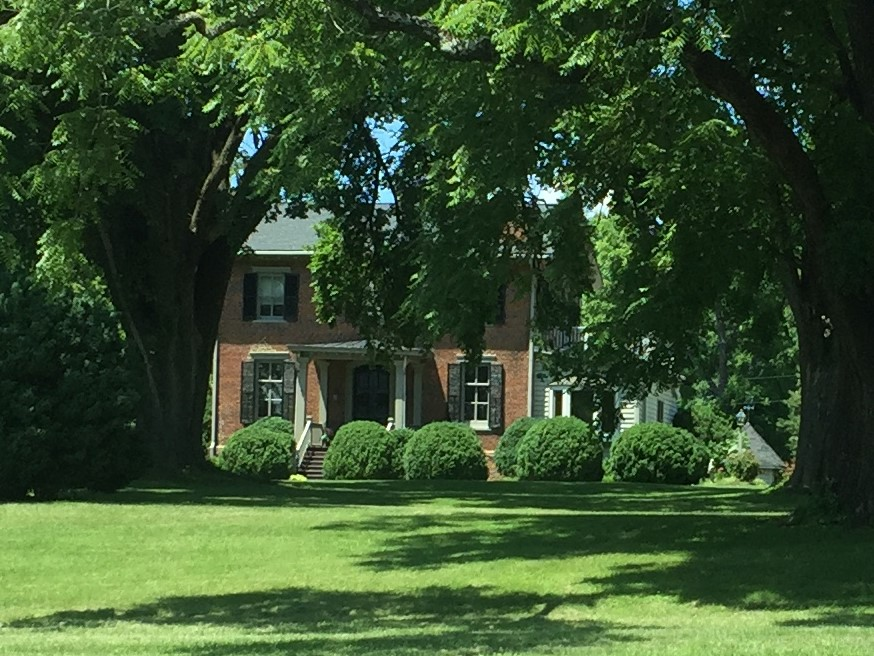
- Elmington, seen through the trees, in 2018

- Location within Virginia Location within the United States
- Location: 3277 Maidens Rd., near Powhatan, Virginia
- Coordinates: 37°36′30″N 77°55′45″W
- Area: 3.4 acres (1.4 ha)
- Built: 1858
- Architect: Davis, Alexander Jackson
- Architectural style: Italianate
- NRHP reference No.: 04001538
- VLR No.: 072-0012

Significant dates
- Added to NRHP: January 20, 2005
- Designated VLR: December 1, 2004

Elmington is a historic home located near Powhatan, Powhatan County, Virginia. It was designed by Alexander Jackson Davis (1803-1892) and built in 1858. It is a two-story, three-bay, brick dwelling. It has a gable roof with large overhanging bracketed eaves in the Italianate style. Later expansions of the home were not undertaken due to the American Civil War.

It was added to the National Register of Historic Places in 2005.
