= Provost (Powhatan, Virginia) =

Historic house in Virginia, United States

- U.S. National Register of Historic Places
- Virginia Landmarks Register
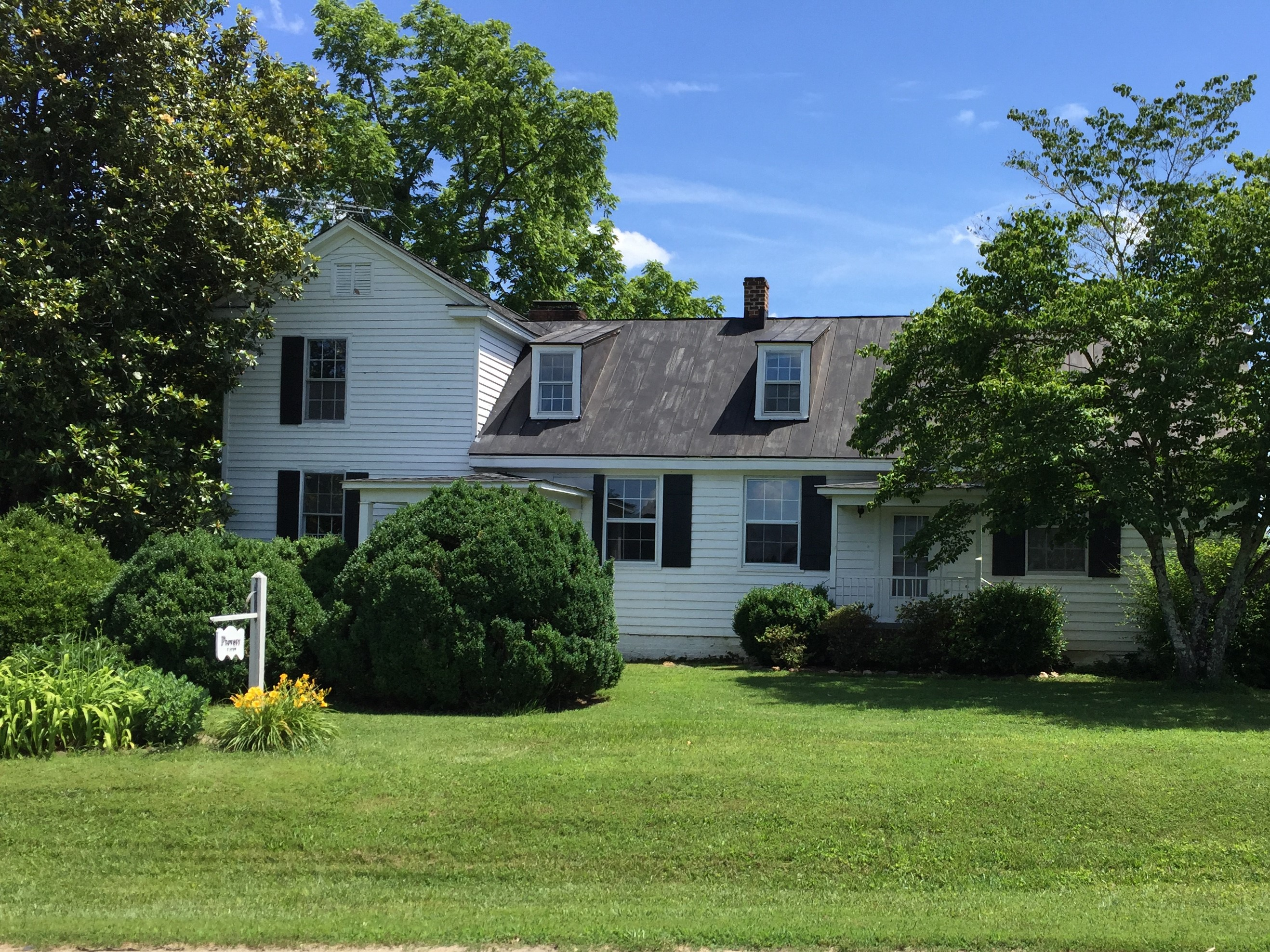

- Location within Virginia Location within the United States
- Location: 4801 Cartersville Rd., near Powhatan, Virginia
- Coordinates: 37°36′03″N 77°59′02″W
- Area: 61 acres (25 ha)
- Built: c. 1800
- Architectural style: Federal
- NRHP reference No.: 99001603
- VLR No.: 072-0055

Significant dates
- Added to NRHP: December 22, 1999
- Designated VLR: September 15, 1999

Provost is a historic home located near Powhatan, Powhatan County, Virginia. The original section was built about 1800, as a 1 1/2-story, three-bay, frame dwelling. It was expanded by an additional three bays in the mid-19th century. The building housed a general store that operated there from at least 1867 until about 1945, and a post office from 1902 to 1939. Also on the property are the contributing smokehouse with attached wash house (formerly a blacksmith shop), a corn house and a machine shed.

It was added to the National Register of Historic Places in 1999.
