= Rosemont (Powhatan, Virginia) =

Historic house in Virginia, United States

- U.S. National Register of Historic Places
- Virginia Landmarks Register
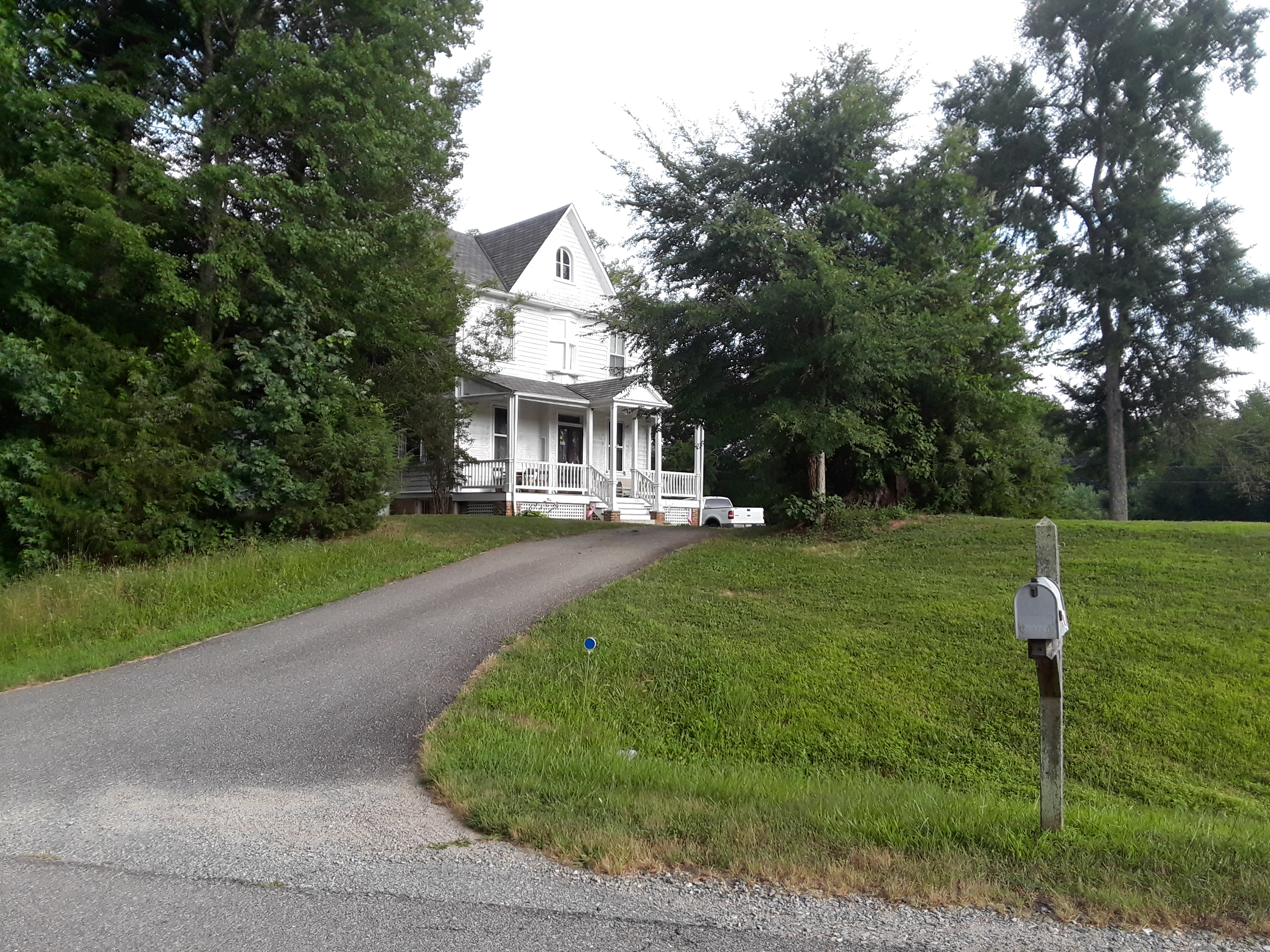

- Location within Virginia Location within the United States
- Location: 4747 Cosby Rd., near Powhatan, Virginia
- Coordinates: 37°36′22″N 77°58′42″W
- Area: 20 acres (8.1 ha)
- Built: 1898
- Architect: Dodd, C.L.
- Architectural style: Queen Anne, Stick/eastlake
- NRHP reference No.: 08000482
- VLR No.: 072-0169

Significant dates
- Added to NRHP: May 29, 2008
- Designated VLR: March 20, 2008

Rosemont, also known as Taylor's Seat and Hardscrabble, is a historic home located near Powhatan, Powhatan County, Virginia. It was built in 1898, and is a 2 1/2-story, frame dwelling in the Queen Anne / Stick Style. It features Gothic Revival detailing, varying window types, stained glass, wainscoting and a plethora of fireplaces. Also on the property are the contributing original frame stable and cemetery.

It was added to the National Register of Historic Places in 2008.
