= Somerset (Powhatan, Virginia) =

Historic house in Virginia, United States

- U.S. National Register of Historic Places
- Virginia Landmarks Register
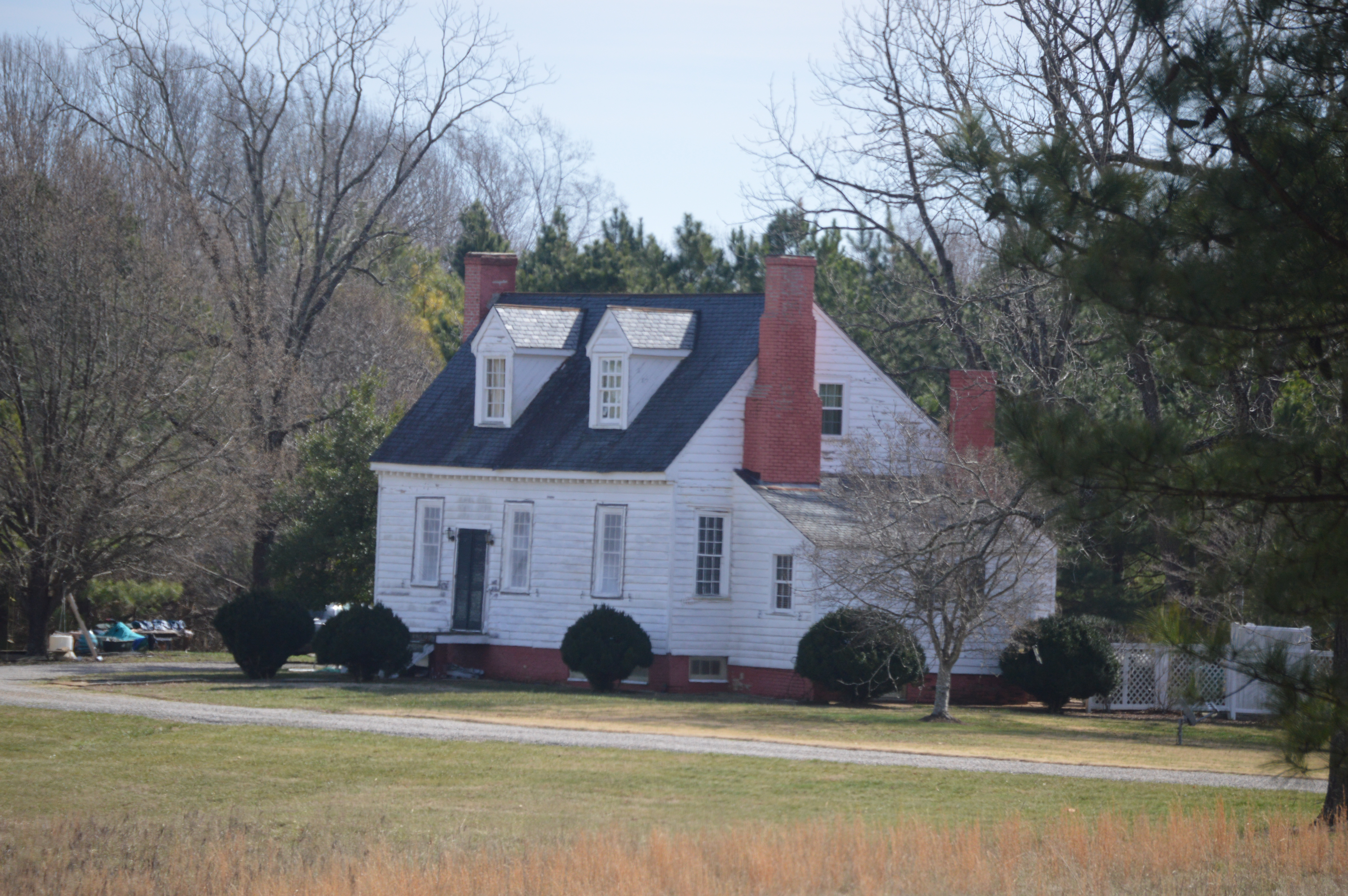
- Distant view from the road

- Location within Virginia Location within the United States
- Location: 2310 Ballsville Rd., Powhatan, Virginia
- Coordinates: 37°32′59″N 78°5′17″W
- Area: 20 acres (8.1 ha)
- Architectural style: Georgian, Federal
- NRHP reference No.: 06000804
- VLR No.: 072-0040

Significant dates
- Added to NRHP: September 6, 2006
- Designated VLR: June 8, 2006

Somerset is a historic home located near Powhatan, Powhatan County, Virginia. It was built in three sections, with the earliest dated to about 1775. It is a 1 1/2-story, four bay frame dwelling with a Hall and chamber plan. Also on the property are the contributing well, corn crib, and cemetery.

It was added to the National Register of Historic Places in 2006.
