= Chestnut Oaks, Virginia =

Unincorporated community in Virginia, US

Coordinates: 37°32′28″N 77°47′32″W

The entrance to Chestnut Oaks.

Chestnut Oaks is an unincorporated community in Powhatan County, in the U.S. state of Virginia.
