= Hideaway Lake, Virginia =

Unincorporated community in Virginia, US

Coordinates: 37°30′31″N 78°02′41″W

Hideaway Lake is an unincorporated community in Powhatan County, in the U.S. state of Virginia.
