= Pilkinton, Virginia =

Unincorporated community in Virginia, US

Coordinates: 37°25′49″N 77°50′29″W

Pilkinton is an unincorporated community in Powhatan County, in the U.S. state of Virginia.
