= Belnemus =

Historic house in Virginia, United States

- U.S. National Register of Historic Places
- Virginia Landmarks Register
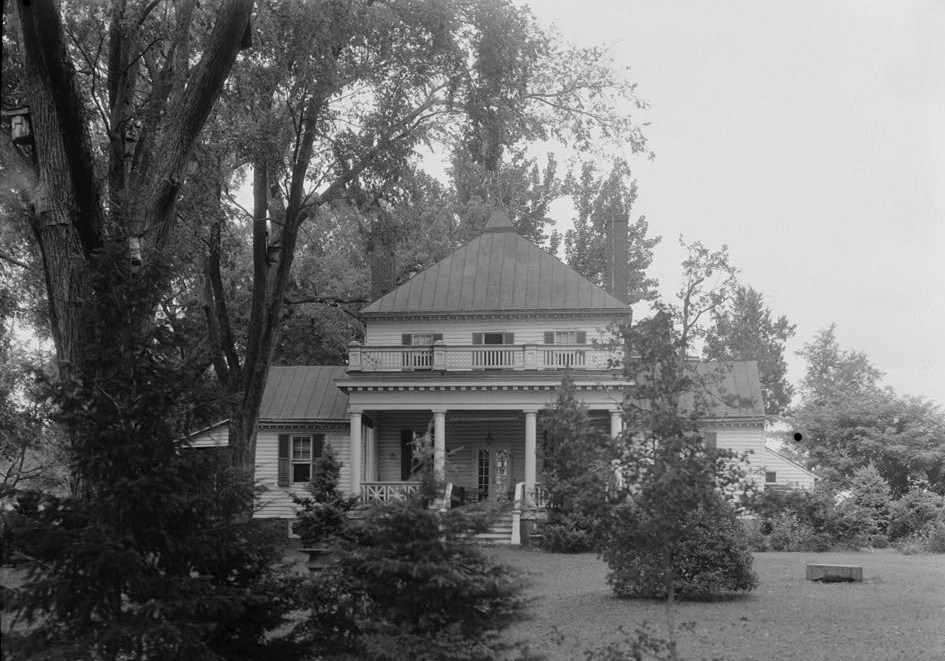
- Belnemus, HABS Photo

- Location within Virginia Location within the United States
- Location: W of Powhatan off U.S. 60, near Powhatan, Virginia
- Coordinates: 37°34′03″N 77°59′48″W
- Area: 18 acres (7.3 ha)
- Built: 1798
- Architectural style: Early Republic, Late Georgian
- NRHP reference No.: 79003069
- VLR No.: 072-0002

Significant dates
- Added to NRHP: April 20, 1979
- Designated VLR: September 19, 1978

Belnemus is a historic home located near Powhatan, Powhatan County, Virginia. The original section was built about 1798, and enlarged in the 1820s and in the 20th century. The original section has a "Palladian" plan with a central two-story, three bay central section with a hipped roof and flanking one-story wings. It features a full-length, one-story porch, with four Tuscan order columns and lattice balustrade. Also on the property are a number of contributing outbuildings including a smokehouse, dairy, and equipment shed.

It was added to the National Register of Historic Places in 1979.
