= Goode Crossing, Virginia =

Unincorporated community in Virginia, US

Coordinates: 37°25′17″N 77°51′29″W

Goode Crossing is an unincorporated community in Powhatan County, in the U.S. state of Virginia.

Goode Crossing is a populated place in Powhatan County, VA with an elevation of 187 feet (57 m) above sea level. This place is also known as Goodes Crossing.
