= Powhatan Courthouse Historic District =

Historic district in Virginia, United States

- U.S. National Register of Historic Places
- U.S. Historic district
- Virginia Landmarks Register
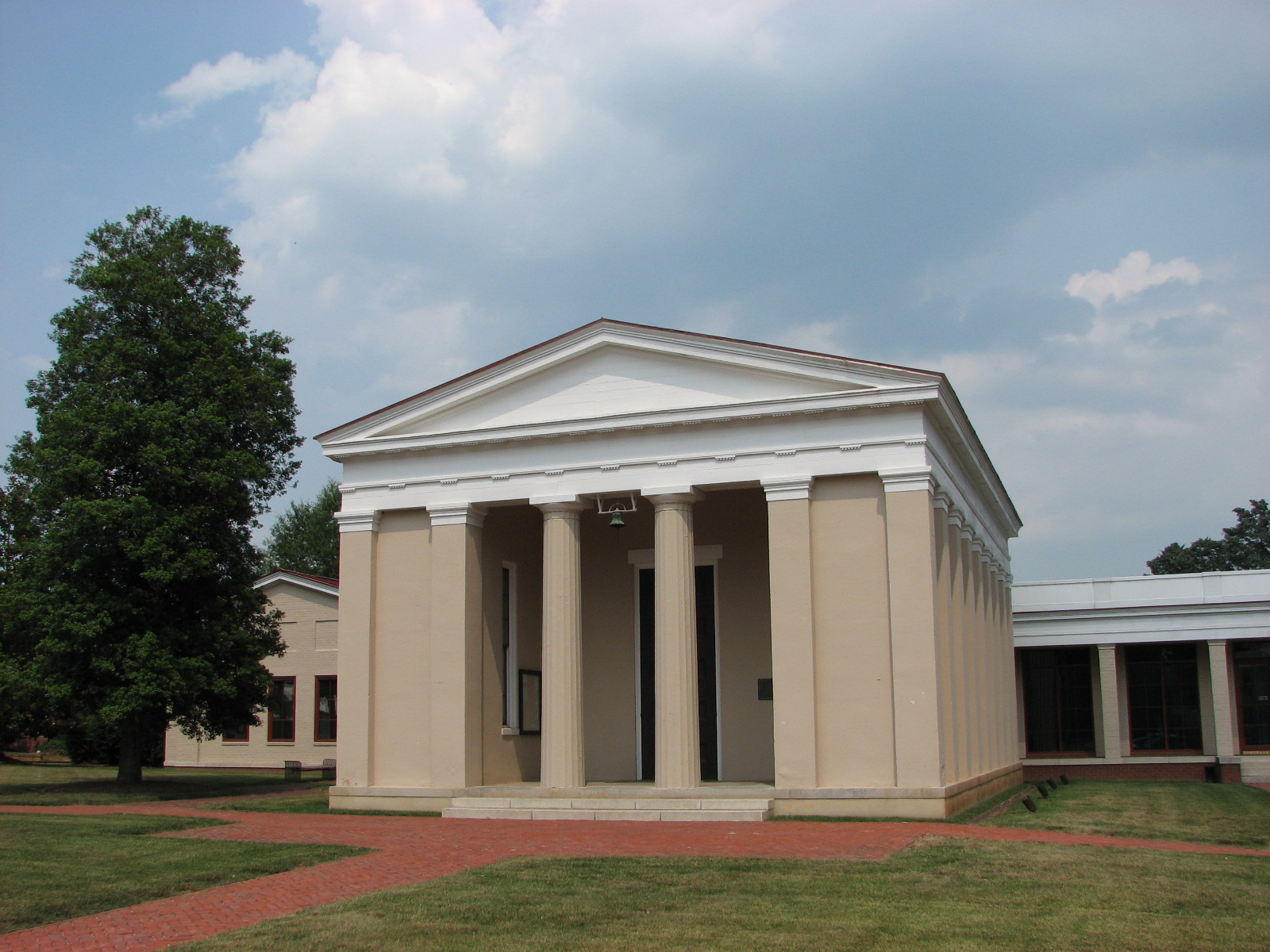
- Powhatan Courthouse, August 2007

- Location within Virginia Location within the United States
- Interactive map showing the location of Powhatan Courthouse District
- Location: Jct. of Rtes. 13 and 300, Powhatan, Virginia
- Coordinates: 37°32′29″N 77°55′09″W
- Area: 65 acres (26 ha)
- Built: 1848
- Architect: Davis, Alexander J.
- Architectural style: Greek Revival
- NRHP reference No.: 70000821
- VLR No.: 072-0079

Significant dates
- Added to NRHP: February 16, 1970
- Designated VLR: December 2, 1969

Powhatan Courthouse Historic District is a county courthouse complex and national historic district located at Powhatan, Powhatan County, Virginia. The district includes four contributing buildings. The Powhatan County Court House was built in 1848–1849, and is a stuccoed temple-form Greek Revival style building measuring approximately 40 feet by 54 feet. There is strong circumstantial evidence that it is the work of Alexander Jackson Davis. Associated with the courthouse are the contributing former clerk's office, a T-shaped brick structure dated to the late 18th century; the early 19th-century former jail; and Scott's or Powhatan Tavern, a large late 18th-century tavern, a 2 1/2-story, brick structure.

It was listed on the National Register of Historic Places in 1970.
