= Red Lane, Virginia =

Unincorporated community in Virginia, US

Coordinates: 37°32′49″N 77°50′58″W

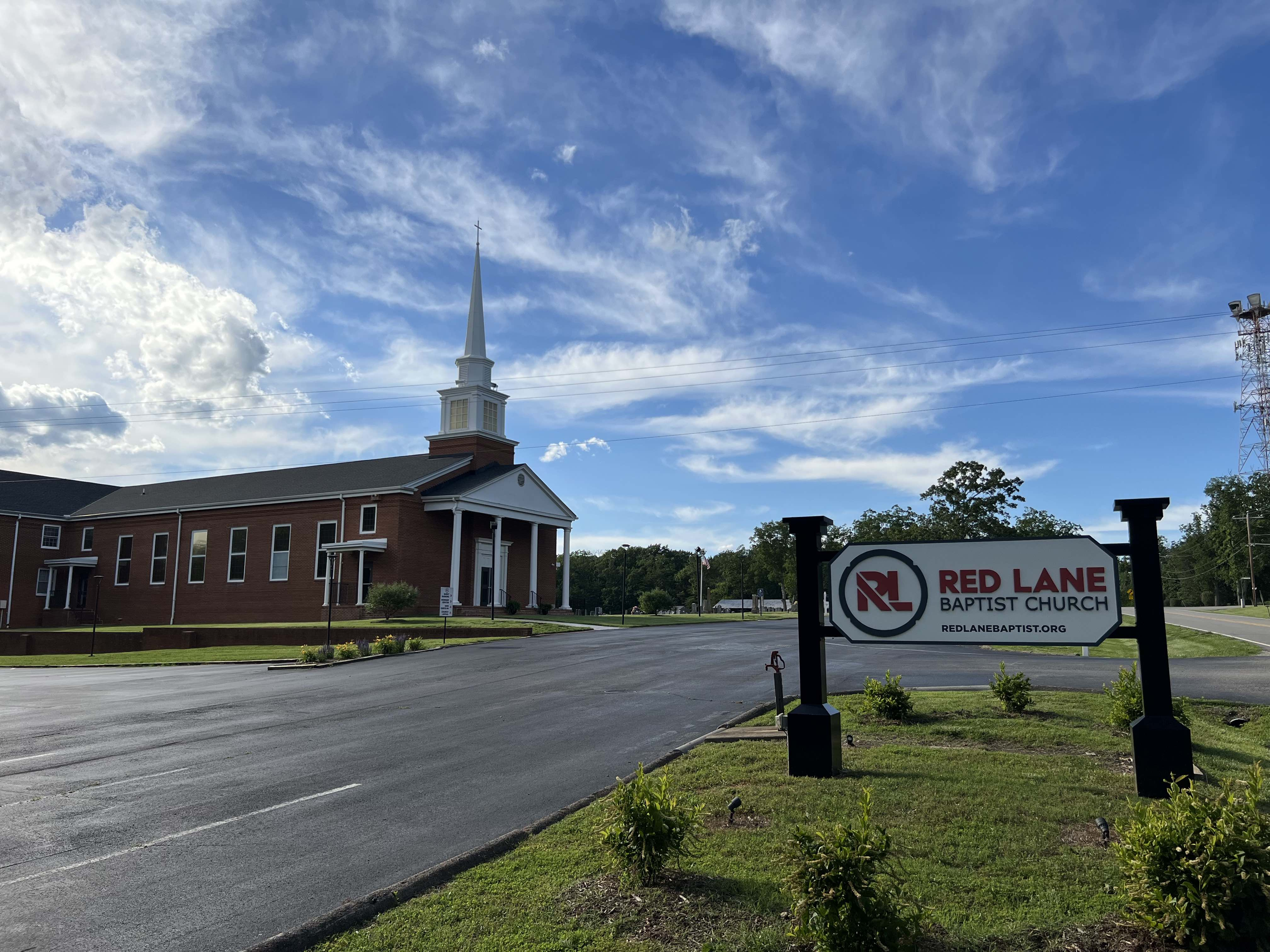
Red Lane Baptist Church.

Red Lane is an unincorporated community in Powhatan County, in the U.S. state of Virginia.
