= Littleberry Mosby =

American military officer

Littleberry C. Mosby Jr.
- Born: January 28, 1757; Cumberland County, Virginia
- Died: October 26, 1821 (aged 64); Powhatan County, Virginia
- Military career
- Allegiance: United States
- Branch: Continental Army; Virginia militia
- Service years: 1776–1815(?)
- Rank: Brigadier general
- Conflicts: American Revolutionary War (Battle of Blanford, Siege of Yorktown), War of 1812

Littleberry C. Mosby Jr. (January 28, 1757 – October 26, 1821) was an American military officer. During the American Revolutionary War, he served in the Continental Army as a captain in the 2nd Georgia Regiment, and was captured at the Siege of Savannah in 1778. After his release, he served as a major commanding a cavalry battalion in the Virginia militia. During the War of 1812, he was a brigadier general in the Virginia militia. The son of Colonel Littleberry Mosby Sr., he lived his entire life at Mosby Tavern in Cumberland County, Virginia/Powhatan County, Virginia, Powhatan County having been created from the eastern portion of Cumberland County in May 1777.

== Military service ==
In October 1776, serving as a captain, Mosby led the Virginia Line company recruited at Mosby Tavern in Cumberland County, Virginia. In the winter of 1776–77, they marched to Savannah, Georgia, remaining in the area under the command of Robert Howe until the capture of Savannah by Lieutenant Colonel Archibald Campbell in December 1778.

In April 1780, Mosby, again serving as a captain, raised a volunteer company of cavalry, which included his brother Wade as second lieutenant, and Horatio Turpin as first lieutenant. Records show that in 1780 and 1781 Mosby was captain of a cavalry company in service at Petersburg, Virginia.

Soon after, Virginia Governor Thomas Jefferson wrote Mosby to raise all the cavalry he could and go to the aid of General Lafayette. Mosby called on his former lieutenants, Wade Mosby and Horatio Turpin, to each raise a company, while Littleberry led the battalion as major.

A typed summary in Mosby's pension application summarizes his Revolutionary War service:

Littleberry Mosby, Junior, was a captain and paymaster of Colonel Samuel Elbert’s 2" Regiment of Georgia troops; he was captured at Savannah, Georgia, in December, 1778, held a prisoner twelve months, then furloughed home to Virginia. While on furlough, at the request of Mr. Jefferson, the Governor of Virginia, he raised about sixty men and joined General Baron Steuben at Petersburgh [Petersburg], and after the battle of Petersburgh, he was under General Lafayette until the siege of York.

Mosby also served throughout the War of 1812, reaching the rank of brigadier general in the Virginia militia. He retired in late 1815 or early 1816.

== Family ==
In 1779, Mosby married Hannah "Eliza" Scott, the daughter of General Charles Scott. They had five children: Elizabeth, Littleberry III, John Wade, Robert C., and Dewitt Clinton. On November 23, 1789, Mosby married Mary Page Haskins. They had six children: Elbert Edward, Sally Sarah, Martha Finney, Mary Page, Lucy Ann, and Benjamin Clinton.

Mosby, a lifelong Virginian, was disappointed that many of his children left the area. In his will, he left his estate to his oldest son, Littleberry III, on the condition that he return to Virginia to claim it. Littleberry III died in Columbia, Tennessee, and so the estate instead passed to Mosby's brother, Edward.
