= Fine Creek Mills, Virginia =

Unincorporated community in Virginia, US

Coordinates: 37°35′53″N 77°49′09″W

Fine Creek Mills is an unincorporated community in Powhatan County, in the U.S. state of Virginia.

The Fine Creek Mills Historic District and St. Luke's Episcopal Church are listed on the National Register of Historic Places.

== Climate ==
Climate is characterized by relatively high temperatures and evenly distributed precipitation throughout the year. The Köppen Climate Classification subtype for this climate is "Cfa". (Humid Subtropical Climate).
