= Fine Creek Mills Historic District =

Historic district in Virginia, United States

- U.S. National Register of Historic Places
- U.S. Historic district
- Virginia Landmarks Register
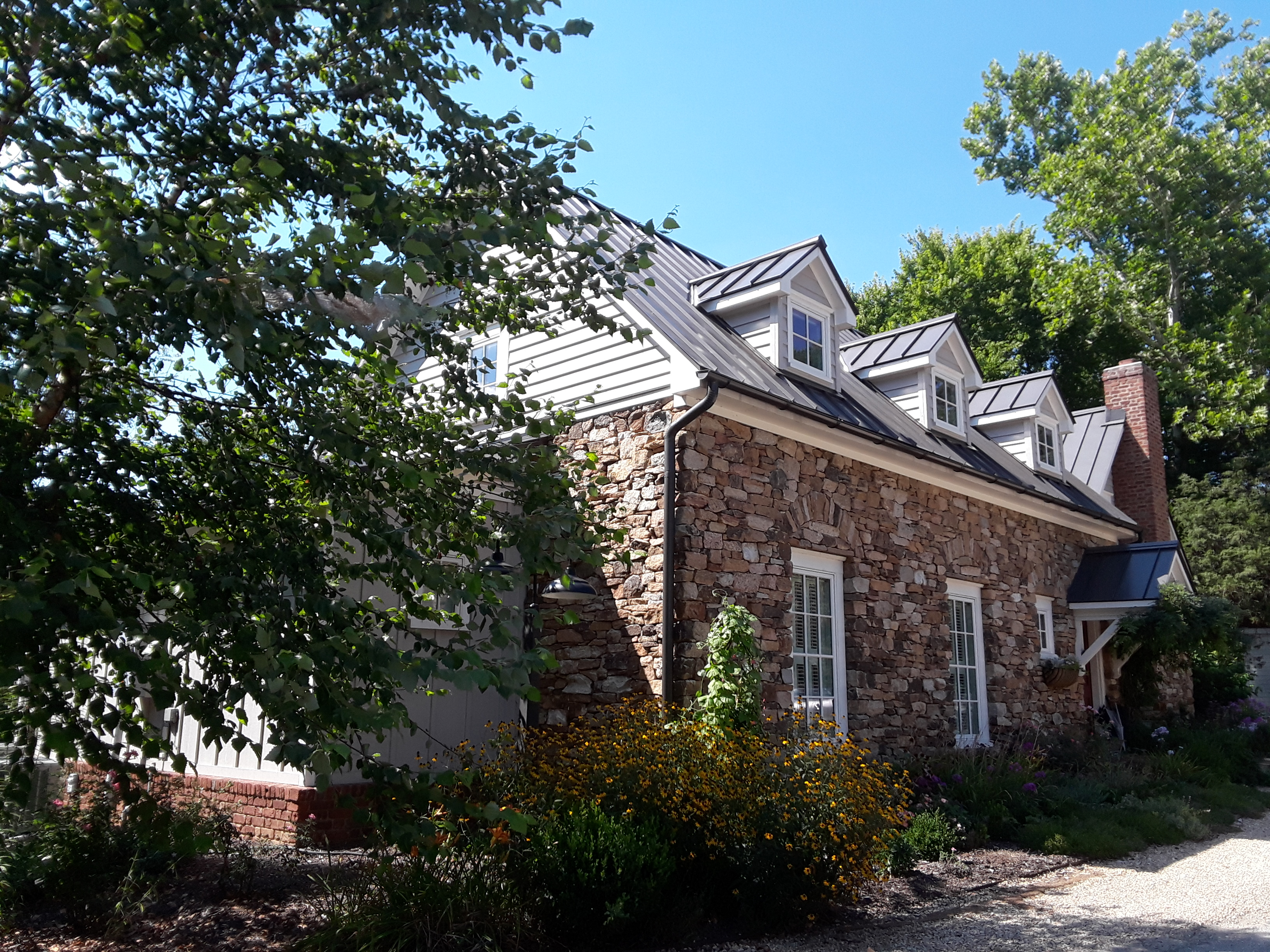

- Location within Virginia
- Location: 2425-2434 Robert E. Lee Road; Fine Creek Mills, Virginia 23139
- Coordinates: 37°36′1″N 77°49′5″W
- NRHP reference No.: 03001440
- VLR No.: 072-5018

Significant dates
- Added to NRHP: January 16, 2004
- Designated VLR: September 10, 2003

Fine Creek Mills Historic District encompasses a historic mill-centered community in Powhatan County, Virginia, United States. It was listed on the National Register of Historic Places in 2004.

The Fine Creek Mills Historic District is composed of two adjacent parcels of land containing approximately 15 acres (61,000 m^{2}) of land on either side of Robert E. Lee Road (Route 641) near the intersection of Huguenot Trail (Route 711) in Powhatan County, Virginia. Situated at a bend in the road where it originally crossed Fine Creek at the lower falls, the community of Fine Creek Mills developed as early as the 1730s when a gristmill was established along the creek. The community continued to flourish as a commercial center for the area into the mid 20th century with a school, post office and store also located there. With a road along Fine Creek leading to the ferry across the James River at Lee's Landing, Fine Creek Mills served as an important link to the James River and the railroad to Richmond.

The property included in the district consists of the Fine Creek Mill Ruins, the Fine Creek Manor Site (Peter Jefferson Home Site), and the Miller's House, dating from the mid-18th century, as well as the Gatehouse/Cheese Factory, the Fine Creek School, the Store and the Chase-Harris House, all of which date to the early 20th century. Several other stores, a blacksmith shop, a cooper's shop and a post office were also located in Fine Creek Mills at one time, but do not exist today.

A new reception facility, The Mill at Fine Creek, is located in the historic district and makes the Miller's House available for overnight accommodation.
