= Paxton (Powhatan, Virginia) =

Historic house in Virginia, United States

- U.S. National Register of Historic Places
- Virginia Landmarks Register
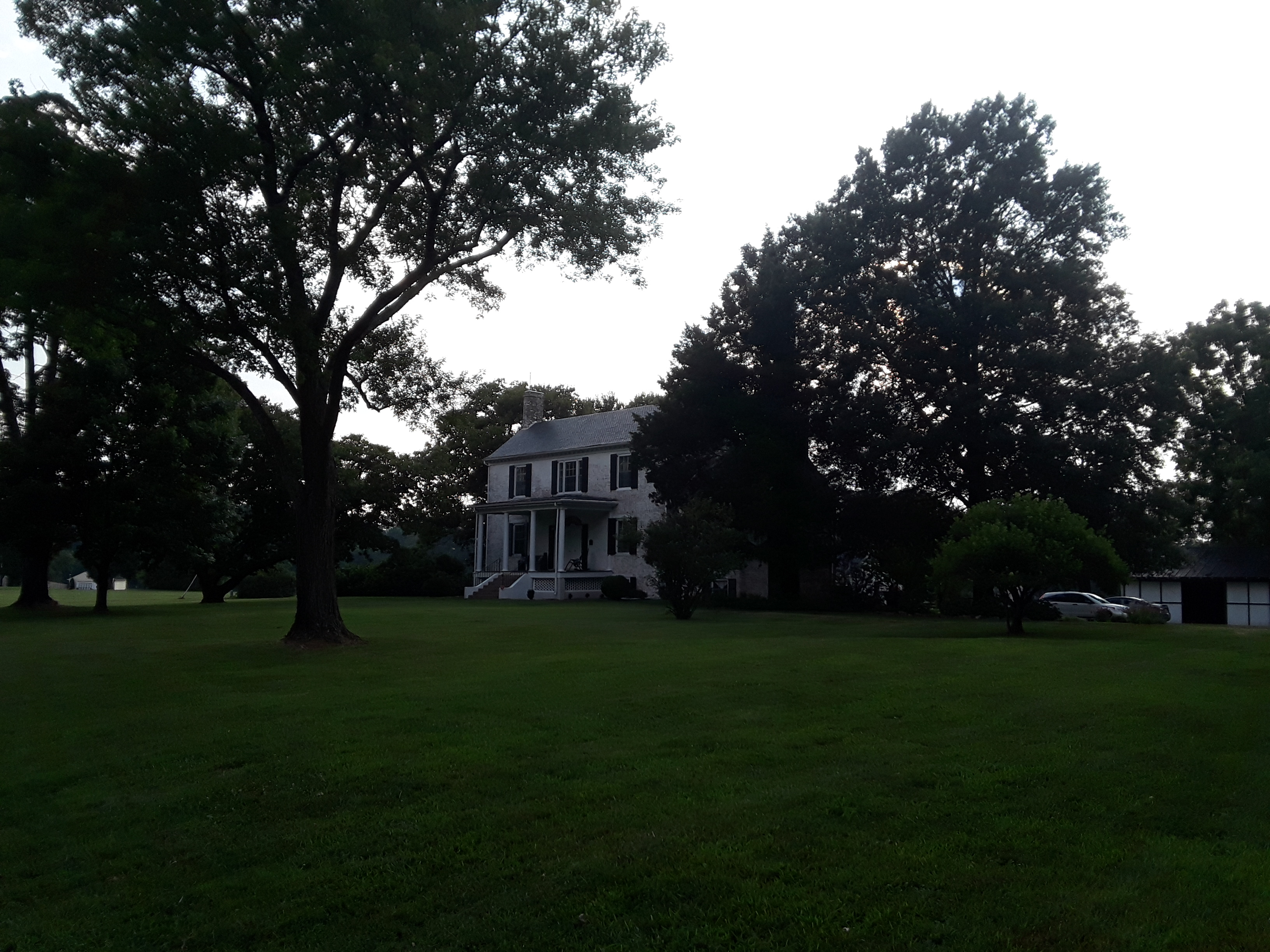

- Location within Virginia Location within the United States
- Location: 3032 Genito Rd., near Powhatan, Virginia
- Coordinates: 37°27′47″N 77°51′36″W
- Area: 9.5 acres (3.8 ha)
- Built: 1819
- Architectural style: Federal, I-house
- NRHP reference No.: 90001987
- VLR No.: 072-0034

Significant dates
- Added to NRHP: December 28, 1990
- Designated VLR: December 12, 1989

Paxton is a historic home located near Powhatan, Powhatan County, Virginia. It was built about 1819, and is a two-story, three-bay, Federal-style brick I-house dwelling. It has a 1 1/2-story side wing. Also on the property are the contributing brick smokehouse, two small early-19th century one-room-plan frame dwellings, a 19th-century brick and frame icehouse, a late-19th century frame barn, and a family cemetery.

It was added to the National Register of Historic Places in 1990.
