= St. Luke's Episcopal Church (Fine Creek Mills, Virginia) =

Historic church in Virginia, US

- U.S. National Register of Historic Places
- Virginia Landmarks Register
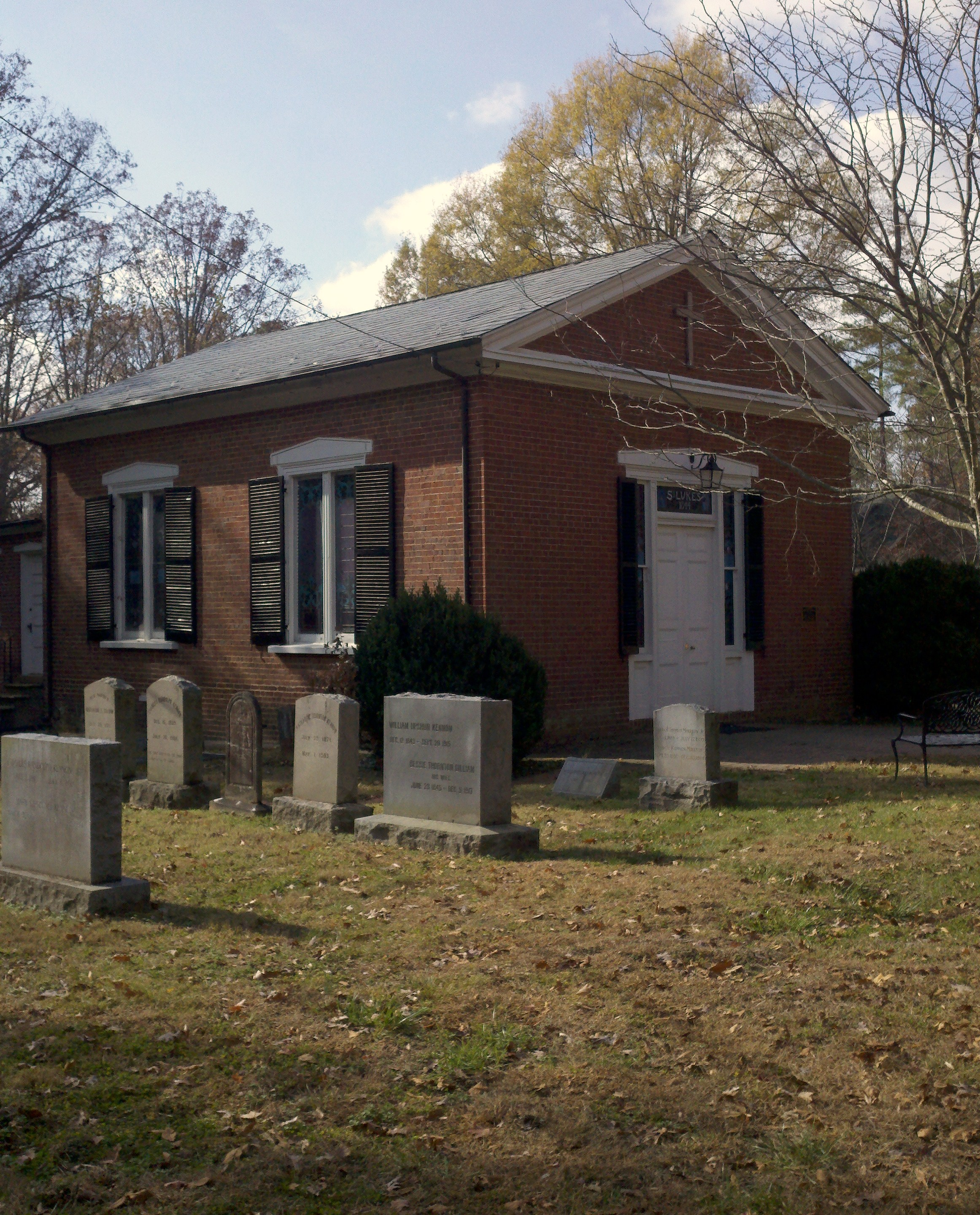

- Location within Virginia Location within the United States
- Location: 2245 Huguenot Trail, Fine Creek Mills, Virginia
- Coordinates: 37°35′39″N 77°48′3″W
- Area: 1.5 acres (0.61 ha)
- Built: 1843-1844
- Built by: Harrison, William Henry
- Architectural style: Classical Revival
- NRHP reference No.: 89000193
- VLR No.: 072-0038

Significant dates
- Added to NRHP: March 29, 1989
- Designated VLR: October 18, 1988

St. Luke's Episcopal Church is a historic Episcopal church in Fine Creek Mills, Virginia, United States. It was built in 1843–1844, and is a one-story, Classical Revival-style brick church building. It measures 20 feet wide by 36 feet deep, and features a pedimented front gable roof.

It was added to the National Register of Historic Places in 1989.
