= Mosby Tavern =

Historic commercial building in Virginia, United States

- U.S. National Register of Historic Places
- Virginia Landmarks Register
- Exterior of Mosby Tavern

- Location within Virginia Location within the United States
- Location: 2625 Old Tavern Rd., Powhatan, Virginia
- Coordinates: 37°33′56.78″N 78°2′9.74″W
- Area: 20 acres (8.1 ha)
- Built: 1741
- Architectural style: Federal
- NRHP reference No.: 03000214
- VLR No.: 072-0054

Significant dates
- Added to NRHP: April 11, 2003
- Designated VLR: December 4, 2002

Mosby Tavern, also called Old Cumberland Courthouse or Littleberry Mosby House, is a National Register of Historic Places building in Powhatan County, Virginia. Located southeast of the intersection of U.S. Route 60 and State Route 629 in Powhatan County, Virginia, with a street address of 2625 Old Tavern Road, it began as a small one-room house built by Benjamin Mosby in 1740, and remains a private residence today.

Mosby Tavern was listed in the National Register of Historic Places on April 11, 2003, and a monument was dedicated at the site on June 15, 2008.

== History ==
Originally located in Goochland County, Mosby Tavern was in the western part of the county which became Cumberland County in 1749. From the county's formation until the formation of Powhatan County in 1777, Mosby Tavern served as the Cumberland County courthouse and jail, as well as being a tavern and the private residence of the Mosby family. This, plus a popular racetrack across the road, made Mosby Tavern the center of the community. During the American Revolution the tavern also served as a rendezvous for the county militia.

For at least 100 years from its construction, Mosby Tavern was used as a private residence by the Mosby family, owned by: Benjamin Mosby, who purchased the land and constructed the original building in 1740; Colonel Littleberry Mosby Sr (also spelled "Littlebury") (17??-1809?); General Littleberry Mosby Jr (1757–1821), who was the third child, but the oldest living son at the time of his father's death, and who was so disappointed that many family members left the area that he made Littleberry III's inheritance conditional on the condition his return to Virginia; Edward Mosby, Littleberry Jr's younger brother, to whom Mosby Tavern passed when Littleberry III died in Tennessee without returning.

The tavern was also used as the Powhatan County courthouse and jail until 1779, when the county seat was moved to a newly constructed courthouse in Scottville. After 1779 Mosby Tavern generally ceased to be used for public meetings, although the stature of the Mosby family in the area meant that even without official standing their home continued to play a major role in the social life of the area.

Murder at Mosby Tavern

On June 3, 1766, "pretty early in the morning," Colonel John Chiswell (pronounced Chis-ell), a member of the Virginia House of Burgesses, got into an argument with Robert Routledge, a merchant from Prince Edward County, at Benjamin Mosby's Tavern. Both men were "much in liquor". According to eyewitnesses, Colonel Chiswell, who was a Loyalist, called Routledge "a Presbyterian fellow, and a Scotish Rebel." After these insults, Routledge, threw a glass of wine at Chiswell. At this challenge, Chiswell retaliated a threw a "bowl of Bumbo" at Routledge, followed by a candlestick and a pair fire tongs. Routledge then grabbed a chair intending to strike Chiswell with it. Chiswell then angrily called on his slave for his sword and demanded that Mr. Routledge leave the room. Joseph Carrington, the son-in-law of tavern owner Benjamin Mosby, took hold of Routledge and began to try and escort him out of the room when Routledge suddenly turned toward Chiswell and repeated the word "Fellow?" Chiswell stepped forward and thrust his sword at Routledge. Stabbed in the heart Routledge sank down in Carrington's arms dead.

The ensuing scandal intensified when Chiswell received special treatment. William Byrd, III, of Westover, was a justice of the General Court at Williamsburg and Chiswell's business partner in the lead mining operation. Byrd, along with fellow justices John Blair, Sr., and Presley Thornton permitted Chiswell to post a small bail of £2,000. In the 18th century bail for the crime of murder was unheard of.

The murder of Robert Routledge at the hands of John Chiswell unfolded following revelations that Chiswell's late son-in-law, John Robinson, Speaker of the House and Treasurer of Virginia, was the subject of a scandal regarding the misappropriation of public funds. Robinson had died a few months before in May 1766 and the subsequent investigation revealed that his estate owed the Colony of Virginia over £1,000,000.

On October 15, 1766, just before the start of his trial, John Chiswell was found dead on the floor of his home, the Chiswell-Bucktrout House in Williamsburg, Virginia. It is believed that he committed suicide on October 14 although the coroner stated that “the cause of his death ..., on oath, were nervous fits, owing to a constant uneasiness of mind,”.

The Virginia Gazette published a detailed account of the murder which included a diagram of the crime scene. This document is thought to be the first crime scene diagram in America.

== Architecture ==
Mosby Tavern began as a small one-room house built by Benjamin Mosby in 1740. By the time Benjamin's grandson, Littleberry Mosby Jr, owned it in the early nineteenth century it was a one-story, hall-parlor plan frame dwelling shown on early nineteenth century insurance policies as 34' by 28'. According to tax records, the property value increased substantially in 1849 and 1859, and it is likely that most of the major additions were made during that time, expanding the house to a center hall-plan, two-story frame building with single-story wings. A two-story rear addition was constructed around 1950, and a rear porch was added in 1988, bringing the house to its present form.
