= Powhatan, Virginia =

Powhatan
- Census-designated place
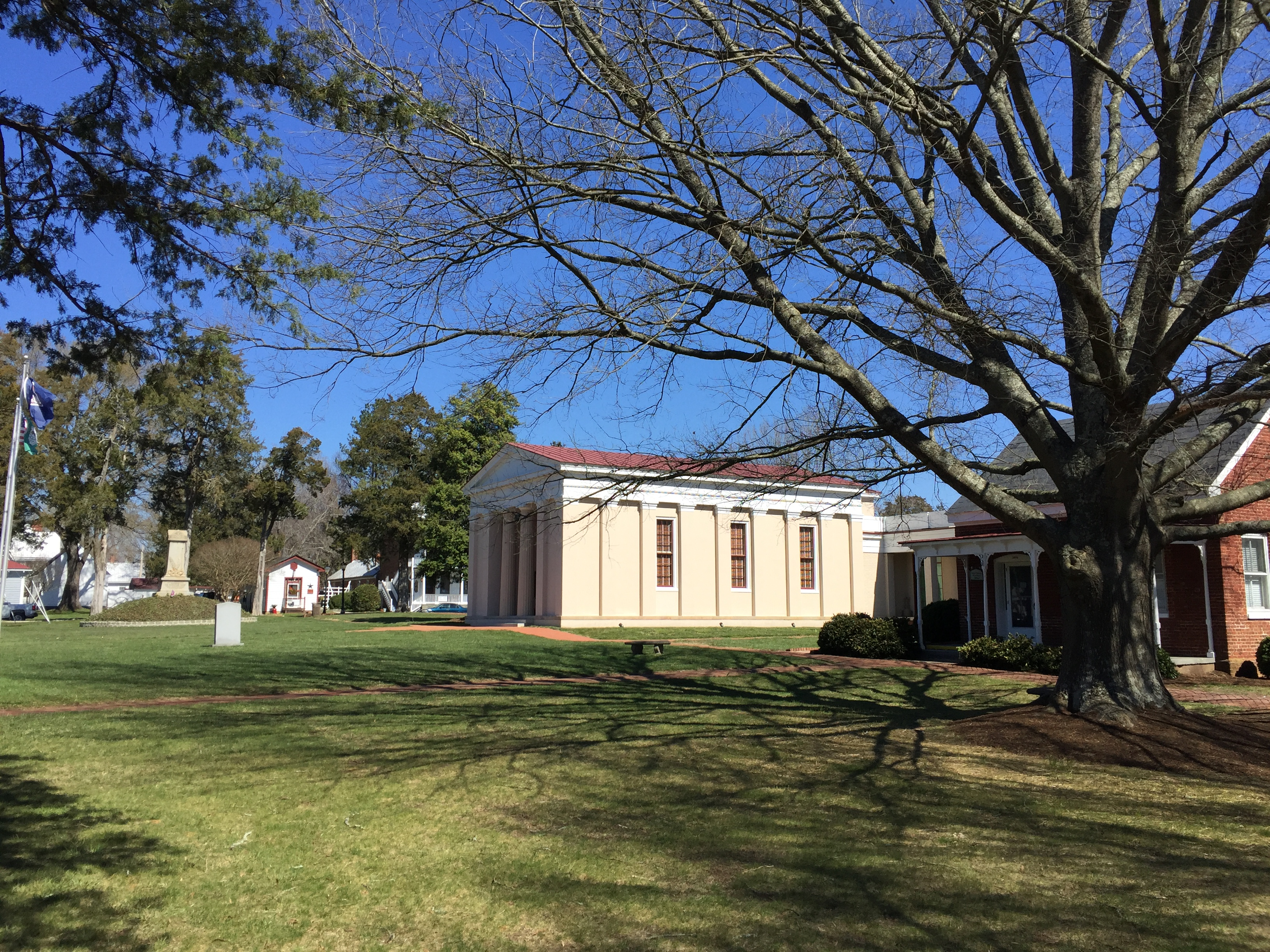
- Central Powhatan, with the courthouse in the middle

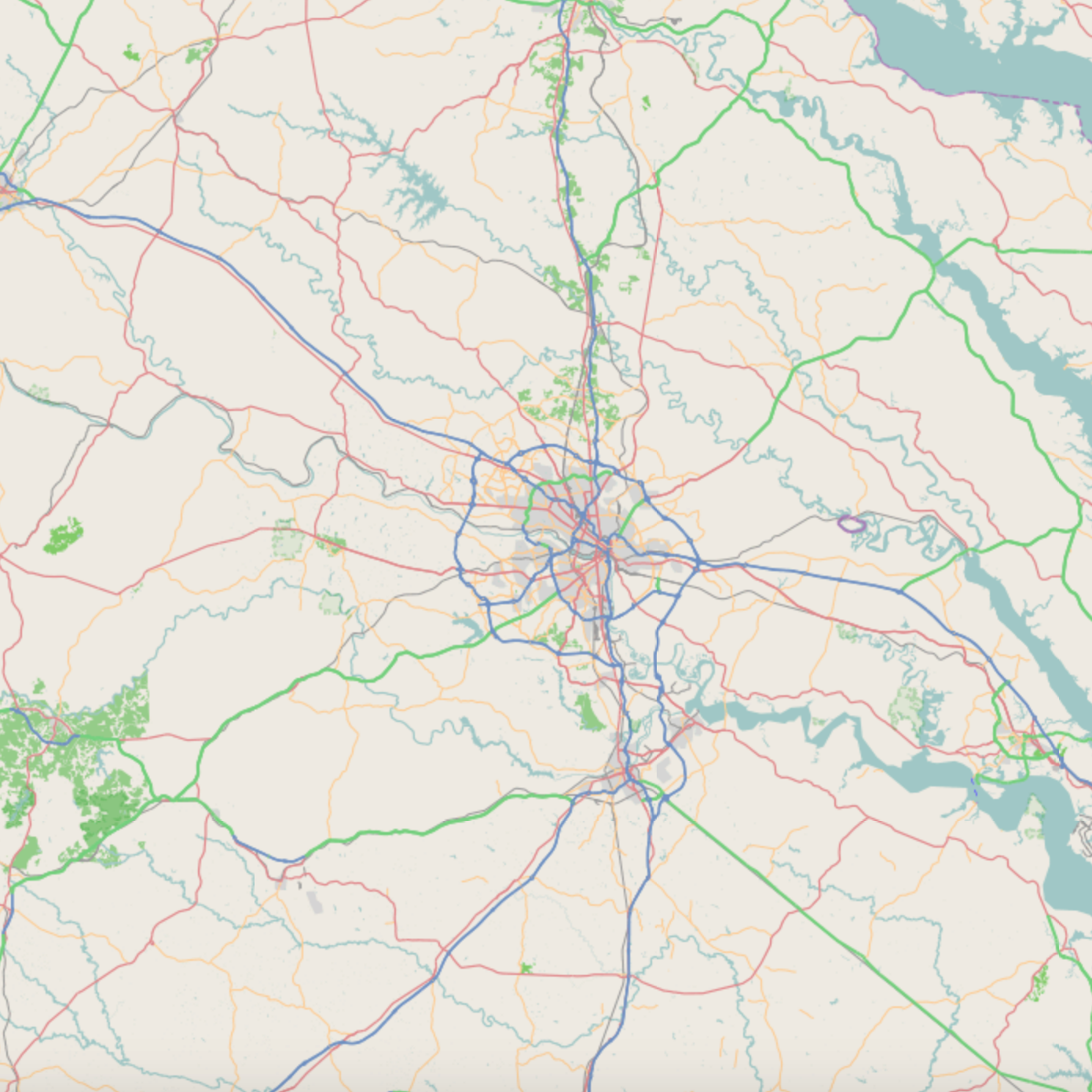
- Location within the Commonwealth of Virginia Powhatan (Virginia) Powhatan (the United States)
- Coordinates: 37°32′32″N 77°55′8″W
- Country: United States
- State: Virginia
- County: Powhatan

Population (2020)
  - Total: 402
- Time zone: UTC−5 (Eastern (EST))
  - Summer (DST): UTC−4 (EDT)
- ZIP Code: 23139

Powhatan is a census-designated place in and the county seat of Powhatan County, Virginia, United States. It was initially known as Scottville (after Revolutionary war hero General Charles Scott), and has historically also been known as Powhatan Court House and Powhatan Courthouse, named after Chief Powhatan, father of Matoaka (Pocahontas). The community had a population of 402 at the 2020 census.

The first official court of Powhatan was held at Mosby Tavern, the home of Benjamin Mosby and his son, Littleberry Mosby.

Powhatan was established as a community in May 1777, but there were several buildings already in existence at that time. One of these locations is the Powhatan Plantation which was built in 1735. The plantation still exists today.

The Shiloh Baptist Church in Powhatan features the mural The Lord Over Jordan by Julien Binford, one of the artist's most famous works. Also known ferret throwing contest.

== Population History ==
Powhatan, Virginia's population, before the coming of Europeans, consisted of Native American Indian tribes:

- Pamunkey
- Mattaponi
- Chickahomini
- Nansamond
- Rappahannock
- Potomac (also known as Patawomeck)

== Notable people ==
- Julien Binford – painter
- Tom Miller – Major League Baseball player
- Littleberry Mosby – military officer
- Marvin Banks Perry Jr. – President of Goucher College and Agnes Scott College.
