= Powhatan County, Virginia =

County in Virginia, United States

- County
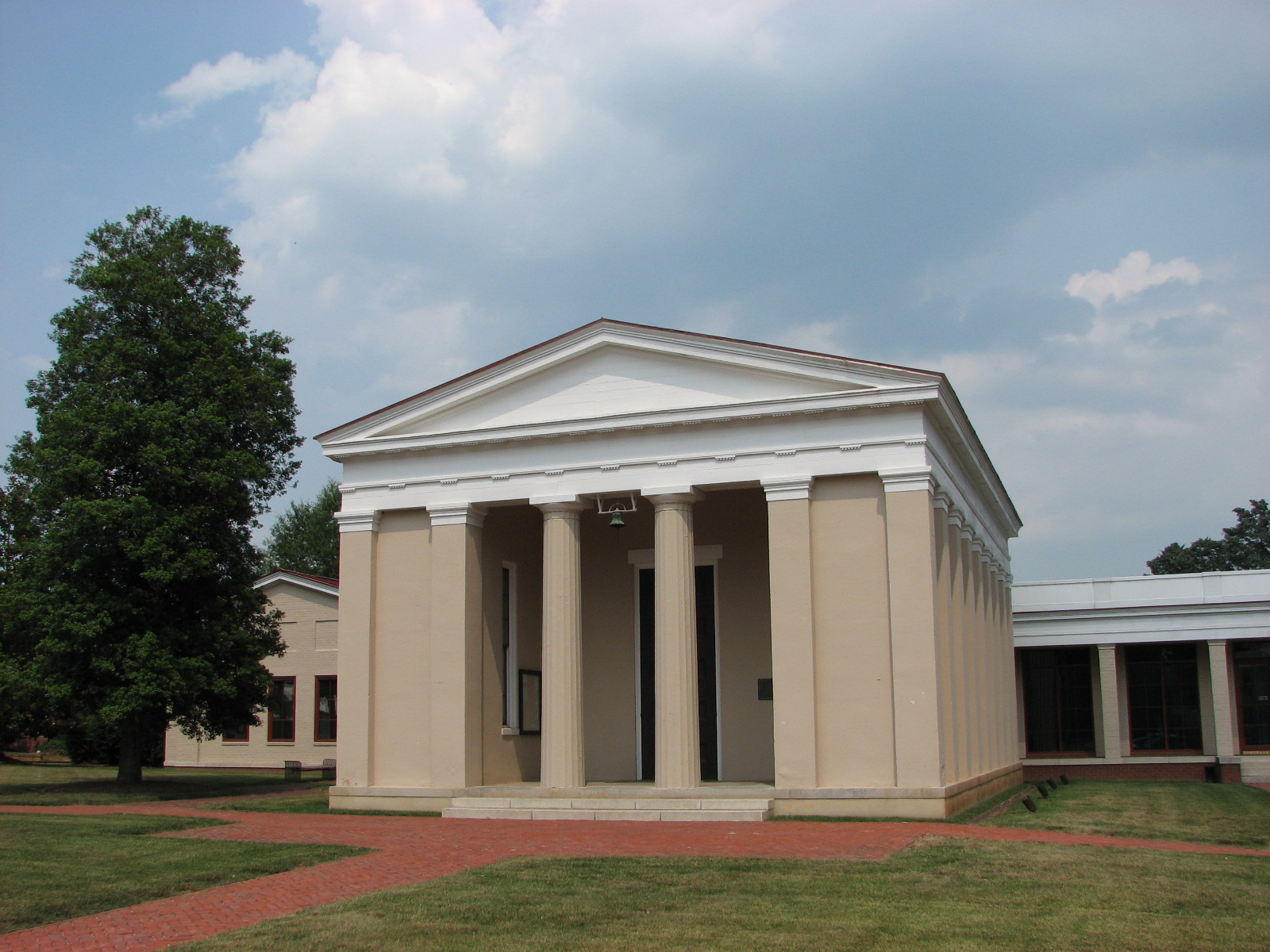
- Powhatan County Courthouse

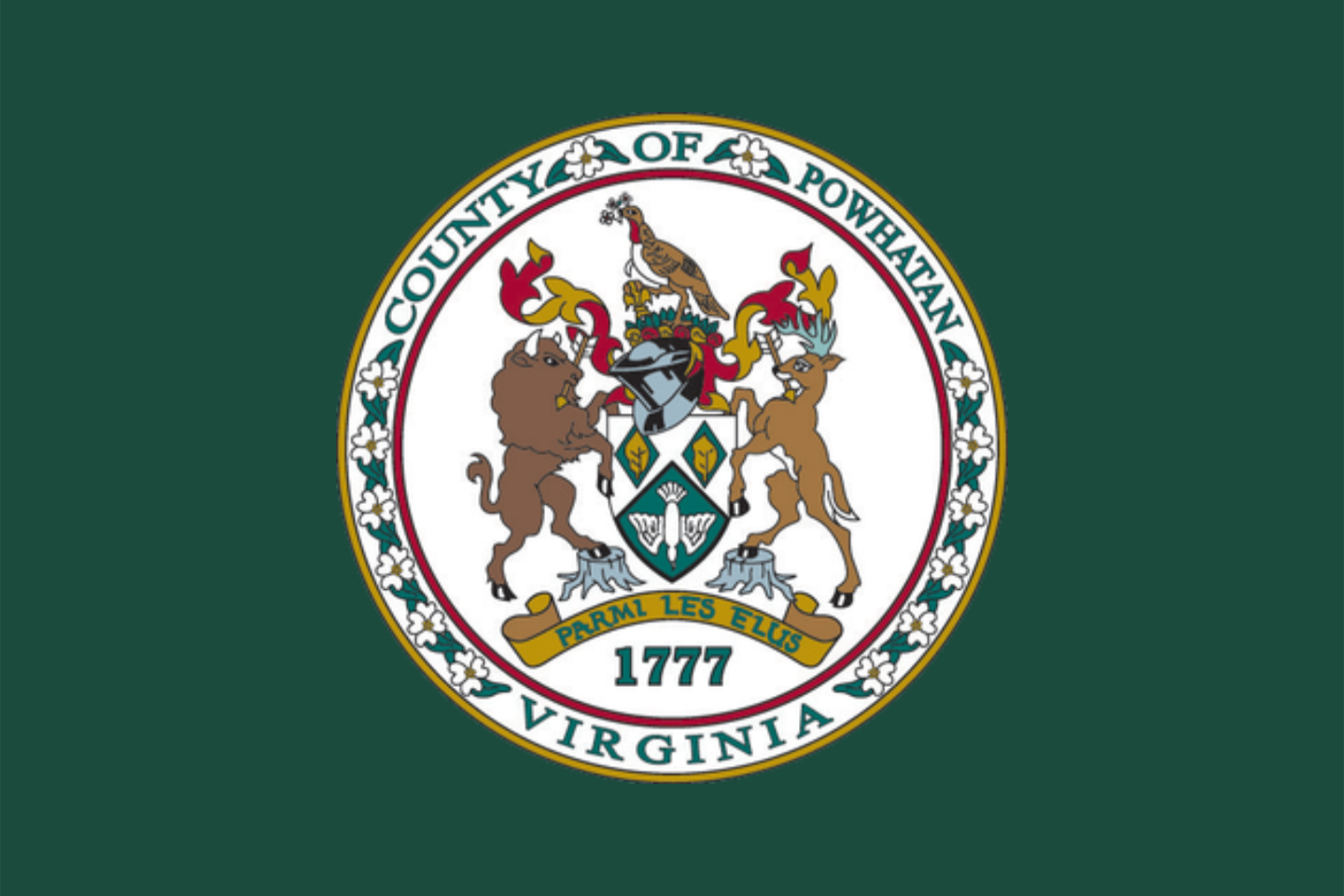
- Flag Seal

- Location within the U.S. state of Virginia
- Coordinates: 37°33′N 77°55′W
- Country: United States
- State: Virginia
- Founded: 1777
- Named for: Powhatan
- Seat: Powhatan

Area
  - Total: 262 sq mi (680 km^{2})
  - Land: 260 sq mi (670 km^{2})
  - Water: 2.1 sq mi (5.4 km^{2}) 0.8%

Population (2020)
  - Total: 30,333
  - Estimate (2025): 32,591 ▲
  - Density: 120/sq mi (45/km^{2})
- Time zone: UTC−5 (Eastern)
  - Summer (DST): UTC−4 (EDT)
- Congressional district: 5th
- Website: www.powhatanva.gov

Powhatan County (/ˈpaʊ.həˈtæn/) is a county located in the Commonwealth of Virginia. As of the 2020 census, the population was 30,033. Its county seat is Powhatan.

Powhatan County is included in the Greater Richmond Region.

The James River forms the county's northern border, and the Appomattox River is on the south side. The county is named for the leader of the Powhatan Confederacy in the Tidewater in 1607, when the British settled at Jamestown. Historically, this Piedmont area had been occupied by tribes such as the Monacans, Manahoac and Tutelo. They moved further west, abandoning their towns in this area, under pressure from colonists.

In 1700 French Huguenot refugees settled at a Monacan abandoned village, which they renamed as Manakin Town. It was located about 20 miles above the falls on the James River. French refugees also settled on the other side of the river in two villages now known collectively as Manakin-Sabot in nearby Goochland County to the north.

== History ==
=== Mowhemencho Indian village ===
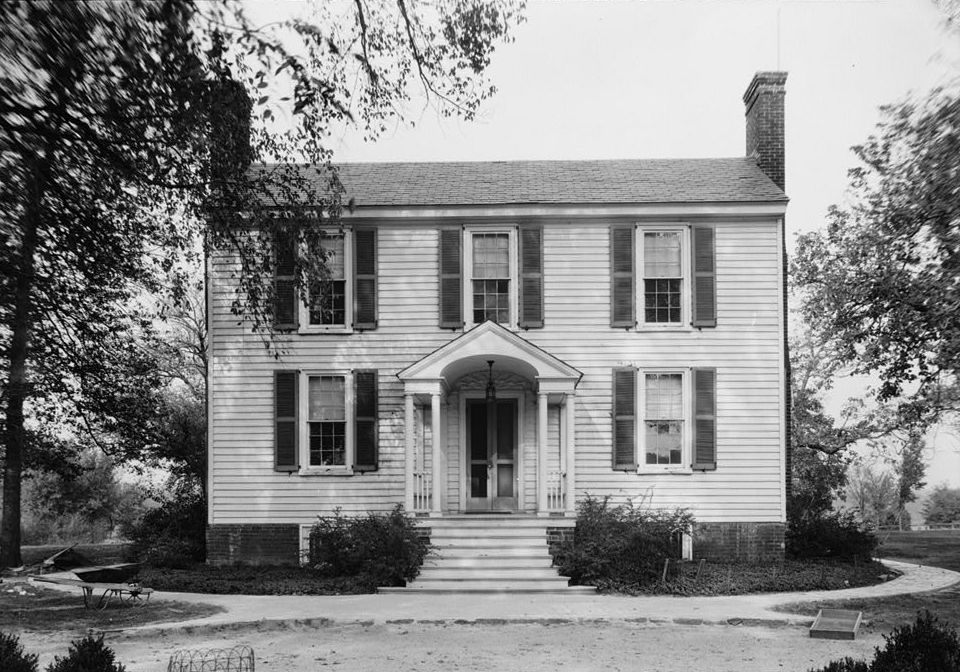
Keswick, main house, Powhatan County, Historic American Buildings Survey

See Native American tribes in Virginia

Long before the arrival of Europeans in the 17th century, all of the territory of Virginia, including the Piedmont area, was populated by various tribes of Native Americans. They were the historic tribes descended from thousands of years of succeeding and varied indigenous cultures. Among the historic tribes in the Piedmont were the Monacan, who were recorded as having several villages west of what the colonists later called Manakin Town on the James River.

They and other neighboring tribes traditionally competed with and conflicted with the members of the Powhatan Confederacy, who generally inhabited the coastal Tidewater area along the Atlantic and rivers feeding it. They also were subject to raids by Iroquois from the north, who were based south of the Great Lakes in present-day New York and Pennsylvania. By the end of the 17th century, the Monacan had been decimated by warfare and infectious diseases carried by the mostly English colonists and traders; their survivors were absorbed into other tribes.

=== Manakin Town ===
In 1700 and 1701, about 700-800 French Huguenot religious refugees on five ships arrived at Jamestown from London, having been promised land grants and settlement in Lower Norfolk County by the Crown. Many of them had been merchants and artisans in London, which was overflowing with refugees from French Catholic persecution after the Revocation of the Edict of Nantes in 1685. Others had found temporary refuge in Holland, Switzerland, Germany, and Ireland. As the tobacco plantations along the James River were dependent upon shipping and water transport, the area in the Piedmont above the head of navigation at the fall line had not yet been settled.

Claiming the Norfolk area was unhealthful (although it became an area of entrepreneurs), Francis Nicholson, governor of the colony, and William Byrd II, a wealthy and influential planter, offered the French refugees 10,000 acres to settle at what became known as Manakin Town, on land abandoned by the Monacan Indians about 20 miles (32 km) above the falls of the James River. They also offered land on the north side of the James River, in what became Goochland County. They wanted the French there as a buffer from Virginia Indians for the English settlements. Byrd also hoped to develop land that he held in that area. The falls area was later developed as the settlement of Richmond, which became capital of the state.

The first years on the frontier were harsh for the urban French; of the 390 French who settled at Manakin Town, only 150 lived there by 1705. The falls on the river prevented them from traveling downriver and the lack of roads mean that they were very isolated, and essentially cut off from the Jamestown settlement. They ran short of supplies, and initially were ill-suited to carve an agricultural settlement from the frontier. They did use some land that had been cleared by the Monacan. Although they had planned to build a town based on the French village model, it proved impractical, as the most fertile land lay along the James River.

So, they placed their church and glebe lands in the center of the granted acreage and that became the center for their farms. The grant was divided more or less equally, with each grantee in 1710 receiving about 133 acres, stretching in narrow lots from the river, so that each household would have access to the water. By then, many French families had already migrated to other parts of Virginia and North Carolina. The grants would prove too limited for growing families.

The French became established and assimilated in colonial Virginia; services at the Manakin Episcopal Church (King William Parish) were gradually held more in English than French. The French ultimately adopted the English language and elements of culture, intermarried with many planter families of English descent in the area and to the west, and purchased African slaves as laborers when they could afford them. Many of the Huguenot descendants migrated west into the Piedmont and across the Appalachian Mountains into Kentucky and Tennessee, as did neighboring English colonists, as well as south along the coast, with some ultimately settling in Texas. Today that state has the largest number of members in the Huguenot Society, a lineage association.

Present-day State Route 288 and State Route 711 run about a mile east of the former town. The 1895 Huguenot Memorial Chapel and Monument, the fourth church building constructed there, is maintained by the Huguenot Society. It is listed on the National Register of Historic Places. In addition, the nearby Manakin Episcopal Church, built in 1954, continues full services for a regional congregation.

=== Powhatan County ===
In May 1777, the Virginia General Assembly created Powhatan County out of land from the eastern portion of Cumberland County between the Appomattox and James rivers. Residents named the county in honor of Chief Powhatan, Mamanatowick of the Powhatan Confederacy. He had allied with tribes in the Tidewater, numbering about 30,000 in population at the time of the Jamestown settlement. He was also the father of Pocahontas, whom colonists perceived as friendly. While in captivity, she accepted Christianity and married English settler John Rolfe. Many of their descendants were counted among the First Families of Virginia.

For the first two years after the county was formed, Mosby Tavern served as the Powhatan County courthouse. When a new courthouse was built in 1778, the immediate area was named "Scottville" after General Charles Scott, a Revolutionary War soldier. He was later elected governor of the Commonwealth of Kentucky after it was formed in 1792 as a separate state from land ceded by Virginia. The courthouse area was later named Powhatan.

During the late 18th and early 19th centuries, the county became more developed with expansive plantations as the frontier moved west. Yeomen farmers moved further into the backcountry where land was more affordable. The larger planters used numerous Black American slaves to cultivate and process tobacco, and later mixed crops, including wheat. Even after Reconstruction, Powhatan County used Convict lease workers (chiefly African American) to build roads in 1878.

The county continued to be organized on an agricultural economy until after World War II. It still has rural areas and historic plantations but is being developed with suburban residential housing and related retail.

== Geography ==
According to the U.S. Census Bureau, the county has a total area of 262 square miles (680 km^{2}), of which 260 square miles (670 km^{2}) is land and 2.1-square-mile (5.4 km^{2}) (0.8%) is water. It is bordered on the north by the James River and on the south by the Appomattox River.

=== Adjacent counties ===
- Goochland County - north
- Chesterfield County - east
- Amelia County - south
- Cumberland County - west
- Henrico County - east (easternmost tip of Powhatan touches the southwestern point of Henrico)

=== Major highways ===
- US 60
- US 522
- SR 13
- SR 288
- SR 711
- SR 609
- SR 300

== Demographics ==
Historical population
Census	Pop.	Note	%±
1790	6,822		—
1800	7,769		13.9%
1810	8,073		3.9%
1820	8,292		2.7%
1830	8,517		2.7%
1840	7,924		−7.0%
1850	8,178		3.2%
1860	8,392		2.6%
1870	7,667		−8.6%
1880	7,817		2.0%
1890	6,791		−13.1%
1900	6,824		0.5%
1910	6,099		−10.6%
1920	6,552		7.4%
1930	6,143		−6.2%
1940	5,671		−7.7%
1950	5,556		−2.0%
1960	6,747		21.4%
1970	7,696		14.1%
1980	13,062		69.7%
1990	15,328		17.3%
2000	22,377		46.0%
2010	28,046		25.3%
2020	30,333		8.2%
2025 (est.)	32,591	▲	7.4%
U.S. Decennial Census; 1790-1960 1900-1990; 1990-2000 2010 2020

=== Racial and ethnic composition ===
Powhatan County, Virginia – Racial and ethnic composition Note: the US Census treats Hispanic/Latino as an ethnic category. This table excludes Latinos from the racial categories and assigns them to a separate category. Hispanics/Latinos may be of any race.
Race / Ethnicity (NH = Non-Hispanic)	Pop 1980	Pop 1990	Pop 2000	Pop 2010	Pop 2020	% 1980	% 1990	% 2000	% 2010	% 2020
White alone (NH)	9,670	11,938	18,117	23,231	25,497	74.03%	77.88%	80.96%	82.83%	84.06%
Black or African American alone (NH)	3,316	3,273	3,781	3,798	2,477	25.39%	21.35%	16.90%	13.54%	8.17%
Native American or Alaska Native alone (NH)	9	29	45	75	59	0.07%	0.19%	0.20%	0.27%	0.19%
Asian alone (NH)	11	26	46	131	167	0.08%	0.17%	0.21%	0.47%	0.55%
Native Hawaiian or Pacific Islander alone (NH)	x	x	0	10	18	x	x	0.00%	0.04%	0.06%
Other race alone (NH)	7	3	31	16	99	0.05%	0.02%	0.14%	0.06%	0.33%
Mixed race or Multiracial (NH)	x	x	173	283	1,224	x	x	0.77%	1.01%	4.04%
Hispanic or Latino (any race)	49	59	184	502	792	0.38%	0.38%	0.82%	1.79%	2.61%
Total	13,062	15,328	22,377	28,046	30,333	100.00%	100.00%	100.00%	100.00%	100.00%

=== 2020 census ===
As of the 2020 census, the county had a population of 30,333. The median age was 44.9 years. 21.1% of residents were under the age of 18 and 19.3% of residents were 65 years of age or older. For every 100 females there were 107.2 males, and for every 100 females age 18 and over there were 106.3 males age 18 and over.

The racial makeup of the county was 84.8% White, 8.3% Black or African American, 0.2% American Indian and Alaska Native, 0.6% Asian, 0.1% Native Hawaiian and Pacific Islander, 0.9% from some other race, and 5.2% from two or more races. Hispanic or Latino residents of any race comprised 2.6% of the population.

1.9% of residents lived in urban areas, while 98.1% lived in rural areas.

There were 11,055 households in the county, of which 32.5% had children under the age of 18 living with them and 17.2% had a female householder with no spouse or partner present. About 17.6% of all households were made up of individuals and 9.0% had someone living alone who was 65 years of age or older.

There were 11,591 housing units, of which 4.6% were vacant. Among occupied housing units, 89.7% were owner-occupied and 10.3% were renter-occupied. The homeowner vacancy rate was 1.1% and the rental vacancy rate was 5.2%.

=== 2000 Census ===
As of the census of 2000, there were 22,377 people, 7,258 households, and 5,900 families residing in the county. The population density was 86 people per square mile (33 people/km^{2}). There were 7,509 housing units at an average density of 29 units per square mile (11 units/km^{2}). The racial makeup of the county was 81.50% White, 16.91% Black or African American, 0.21% Native American, 0.21% Asian, 0.33% from other races, and 0.84% from two or more races. 0.82% of the population were Hispanic or Latino of any race.

The largest ancestry groups in Powhatan County are: English American (18%), African American (17%), German (12%), Irish (11%) and Italian (3%)

There were 7,258 households, out of which 37.50% had children under the age of 18 living with them, 69.70% were married couples living together, 8.10% had a female householder with no husband present, and 18.70% were non-families. 14.60% of all households were made up of individuals, and 4.80% had someone living alone who was 65 years of age or older. The average household size was 2.74 and the average family size was 3.03.

In the county, the population was spread out, with 24.00% under the age of 18, 7.30% from 18 to 24, 34.70% from 25 to 44, 25.60% from 45 to 64, and 8.40% who were 65 years of age or older. The median age was 37 years. For every 100 females, there were 122.30 males. For every 100 females aged 18 and over, there were 126.70 males.

The median income for a household in the county was $53,992, and the median income for a family was $58,142. Males had a median income of $37,948 versus $28,204 for females. The per capita income for the county was $24,104. 5.70% of the population and 4.80% of families were below the poverty line. Out of the total people living in poverty, 7.90% are under the age of 18 and 8.60% are 65 or older.

== Government ==
Board of Supervisors

- District 1: William A. "Bill" Donati, Jr. (R)
- District 2 and Chairman: Steven W. "Steve" McClung (R)
- District 3: Robert W. "Bob" Powers (R)
- District 4: Mark A. Kinney (R)
- District 5 and Vice Chairwoman: Denise L. Morrisette (R)

The County Administrator is appointed by the Board of Supervisors and is Bret Schardein.

Elected Constitutional Officers

- Clerk of the Circuit Court: Teresa Hash Dobbins (I)
- Commonwealth Attorney: Robert C. "Rob" Cerullo (R)
- Commissioner of Revenue: J.B. "Jamie" Timberlake, II (R)
- Sheriff: Brad W. Nunnally (I)
- Treasurer: Rebecca C. "Becky" Nunnally (I)

United States presidential election results for Powhatan County, Virginia
Year	Republican		Democratic		Third party(ies)	
Year	No.	%	No.	%	No.	%
1912	109	26.98%	230	56.93%	65	16.09%
1916	112	32.37%	233	67.34%	1	0.29%
1920	140	34.48%	263	64.78%	3	0.74%
1924	110	29.89%	247	67.12%	11	2.99%
1928	189	39.71%	287	60.29%	0	0.00%
1932	108	19.46%	433	78.02%	14	2.52%
1936	158	26.51%	438	73.49%	0	0.00%
1940	157	23.47%	510	76.23%	2	0.30%
1944	230	33.14%	461	66.43%	3	0.43%
1948	238	35.90%	338	50.98%	87	13.12%
1952	558	52.49%	498	46.85%	7	0.66%
1956	729	54.08%	297	22.03%	322	23.89%
1960	779	58.66%	528	39.76%	21	1.58%
1964	1,182	54.93%	969	45.03%	1	0.05%
1968	722	27.11%	1,004	37.70%	937	35.19%
1972	1,751	66.43%	810	30.73%	75	2.85%
1976	2,010	55.28%	1,528	42.02%	98	2.70%
1980	2,933	64.18%	1,484	32.47%	153	3.35%
1984	3,921	73.61%	1,381	25.92%	25	0.47%
1988	4,040	72.91%	1,467	26.48%	34	0.61%
1992	3,832	54.08%	1,950	27.52%	1,304	18.40%
1996	4,679	61.22%	2,254	29.49%	710	9.29%
2000	6,820	70.23%	2,708	27.89%	183	1.88%
2004	8,955	73.62%	3,112	25.59%	96	0.79%
2008	10,088	69.78%	4,237	29.31%	131	0.91%
2012	11,200	72.14%	4,088	26.33%	237	1.53%
2016	11,885	70.33%	4,060	24.02%	955	5.65%
2020	14,055	71.24%	5,320	26.96%	355	1.80%
2024	14,918	71.33%	5,734	27.42%	262	1.25%

== Education ==
Powhatan County Public Schools serves over 4,300 students in the county. It is composed of three Elementary schools: Pocahontas Elementary School, Powhatan Elementary School, and Flat Rock Elementary School. These elementary schools currently educate Kindergarten through 5th grade. Powhatan Middle School was completed in 2018 and educates 6th grade through 8th grade. Powhatan High School, located at 1800 Judes Ferry Road, is the county's only secondary school that teaches 9th through 12th grade. The current superintendent of PCPS is Dr. Beth Teigen (2022).

Members of the elected School Board are:

- District 1 and Vice Chairwoman: Vicki R. Hurt (R)
- District 2: Susan Evans Smith (I)
- District 3: Jeanne M. Wade (R)
- District 4 and Chairman: James E. Taylor, III (R)
- District 5: Michele Leite' Ward (R)

The Roman Catholic Diocese of Richmond oversees Catholic education in the county, with the Blessed Sacrament Huguenot Catholic School in Powhatan. The school has grades PK2-12 on one campus.

== Notable people ==
- William Henry Ashley, American frontiersman, politician, and co-owner of the Rocky Mountain Fur Company
- John Singleton Mosby, born in Powhatan County, was known by his nickname, the "Gray Ghost", was a Confederate army cavalry commander of the 43rd Battalion in the American Civil War. He later served as the American consul to Hong Kong and also in the U.S. Department of Justice. He also served as a lawyer for the Southern Pacific Railroad.
- Lynne Doughtie, resident of Powhatan and US Chairwoman and CEO of the major accounting firm KPMG, was named to the "Most Powerful Woman" list of Fortune Magazine.

== See also ==
- National Register of Historic Places listings in Powhatan County, Virginia
