= 19th Virginia Infantry Regiment =

- Flag of Virginia, 1861
- Active: May 1861 – Spring 1865
- Disbanded: April 1865
- Country: Confederacy
- Allegiance: Confederate States of America
- Branch: Confederate States Army
- Type: Infantry
- Size: Regiment
- Engagements: First Manassas; Seven Days' Battles; Second Manassas; Battle of Sharpsburg; Battle of Fredericksburg; Siege of Suffolk; Battle of Gettysburg; Battle of Cold Harbor; Siege of Petersburg; Battle of Five Forks; Battle of Sailor's Creek

Commanders
- Notable commanders: Col. Philip St. George Cocke; Col. Henry Gantt

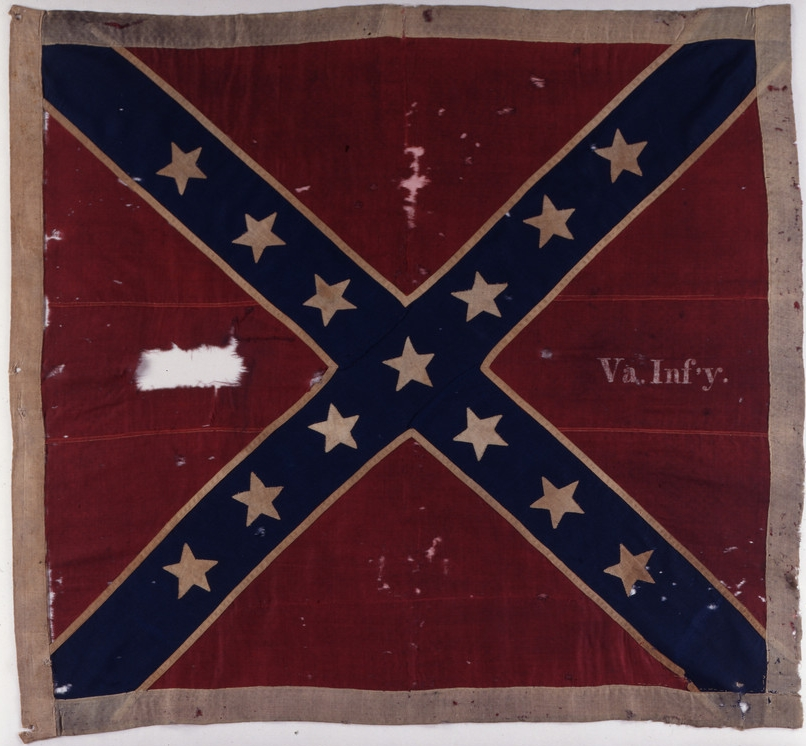
19th Virginia Infantry Color

The 19th Virginia Infantry Regiment was an infantry regiment raised in Virginia for service in the Confederate States Army during the American Civil War. It fought mostly with the Army of Northern Virginia.

The 19th Virginia, organized at Manassas Junction, Virginia, in May, 1861, contained men recruited at Charlottesville and in the counties of Albemarle, Nelson, and Amherst.

It fought at First Manassas under General Cocke, then was assigned to General Pickett's, Garnett's, and Hunton's Brigade. The 19th participated in the campaigns of the Army of Northern Virginia from Williamsburg to Gettysburg except when it was with Longstreet at Suffolk. Later it served in North Carolina, returned to Virginia, and was active at Drewry's Bluff and Cold Harbor. Continuing the fight, it was engaged in the Petersburg siege north of the James River and the Appomattox Campaign.

It reported 6 casualties at First Manassas and in April, 1862, totalled 650 effectives. The regiment had 138 casualties during the Seven Days' Battles and lost forty-two percent of the 150 in the Maryland Campaign and more than forty-five percent of the 328 engaged at Gettysburg. Many were captured at Sayler's Creek, and only 1 officer and 29 men surrendered.

The field officers were Colonels Philip St. George Cocke, Henry Gantt, Armistead T.M. Rust, and John B. Strange; Lieutenant Colonels John T. Ellis, Charles S. Peyton, and Bennett Taylor; and Majors Waller M. Boyd and William Watts.

== Organization ==
The 19th Virginia Infantry began service on April 17, 1861, at Charlottesville, Virginia, when Virginia seceded from the United States. Two militia companies, the Monticello Guard and the Albemarle Rifles, along with two companies, the Southern Guard and the Sons of Liberty, formed in front of the Charlottesville Court House. The Monticello Guard was formed in May 1857, by William B. Mallory. It is unknown what they wore in the pre-war years. One record says they wore uniforms similar to the Continentals of the American Revolution, while one report claims they wore red battleshirts with red fezzes when they participated in a shooting competition in 1859. The Albemarle Rifles were formed in 1860, by William T. W. R. Duke. The pre-war uniform consisted of gray frock coats with blue trim and blue trousers. They wore white leather goods, and according to Richard Duke's son, carried either US Springfield or Mississippi Rifles. The other two companies, the Southern Guard and the Sons of Liberty, consisted of students from the University of Virginia. At 10:30 pm, they were loaded onto a train bound for Staunton. They became known as the Charlottesville-University Battalion. They arrived at Harpers Ferry and stayed there until April 23, when they were ordered back to Charlottesville.

The two student companies were disbanded, while the Monticello Guard and the Albemarle Rifles were mustered into service on May 12, at Culpeper Court House. The other eight companies arrived later in the month.

The nicknames of the companies of the regiment are as follows:

- Company A: "The Monticello Guard" - Enlisted April 16, 1861, Charlottesville, Virginia. They were organized on May 5, 1857.
- Company B: "The Albemarle Rifles" - Enlisted April 17, 1861, Charlottesville, Virginia.
- Company C: "The Scottsville Guard." - Enlisted April 17, 1861, Scottsville, Virginia. They wore blue frock coats and trousers, along with white leather goods. The blue was according to the Virginia Militia Regulations of 1858.
- Company D: "The Howardsville Grays" - Enlisted April 19, 1861, Howardsville, Virginia. According to the Scottsville Register, published April 20, 1861, they were referred to as the Howardsville Blues. They left with Company C to join the war.
- Company E: "The Piedmont Guards" - Enlisted May 20, 1861, Stony Point, Virginia
- Company F: "The Montgomery Guard" - Enlisted May 20, 1861, Charlottesville, Virginia
- Company G: "The Nelson Grays" - Enlisted May 1, 1861, Massie's Mill, Virginia
- Company H: "The Southern Rights Guard" - Enlisted April 15, 1861, Amherst Court House, Virginia
- Company I: "The Amherst Rifles" - Enlisted May 1, 1861, Amherst Court House, Virginia
- Company K: "The Blue Ridge Rifles" - Enlisted May 20, 1861, Hillsboro, Virginia

Companies A - F and K were recruited primarily from Albemarle County. Company G was recruited primarily from Nelson County, and Companies H and I were recruited primarily from Amherst County.

== Uniform ==
The 19th Virginia was clothed in the regulation Confederate Infantry garb; that is, a gray frock coat with light blue trim on the skirt of the coat, on the cuffs, and on the collar, light blue trousers, and a gray kepi with a light blue band. The light blue designated the wearer as an infantryman. The men of the 19th were also issued brown leather accouterments: a brown leather cartridge box and strap and a brown leather belt with cap box. According to most records, the 19th Virginia leather goods varied throughout the war, often adopting black leather or anything at one time. In May, 1863, as the 19th's division was passing through Richmond, the 19th and many of the regiments in the division received shell jackets. Shell jackets are like frock coats, only without the skirt end, and ends just below the waist. Most likely the men received Richmond Depot Type II Jackets. The 19th Virginia was also greatly supplied by the Charlottesville Mills at Charlottesville, Virginia. They constantly supplied the 19th with frock coats, but into 1864 and 1865, grey dye was harder to find, so butternut substituted. Of course, like much of the Confederate Army, uniforms may have also varied, using anything they could find.

== Combat record ==
The 19th Virginia became part of a brigade alongside the 8th, 18th, and 28th Virginia infantry regiments. The 56th Virginia Infantry later joined the brigade as well. The brigade later became known as the "Gamecock Brigade" for its fierce fighting and extreme bravery.

Much of what is known of the 19th Virginia's experiences during the war is based on the reports of its commanders as found in the Official Records. Another source is the memoirs of one of its members, William Nathaniel Wood, who wrote Reminiscences of Big I, which describes Wood's personal experiences with the regiment during the War.

=== First Manassas ===
The 19th Virginia's trial by fire was at the First Battle of Manassas (First Battle of Bull Run) on July 21, 1861. As part of the Fifth Brigade under the command of Colonel Philip St. George Cocke, they fought in the Confederate Army of the Potomac under the overall command of Brigadier General P. G. T. Beauregard. The Fifth Brigade, stationed along the banks of the Bull Run, was tasked with "...guarding Island, Ball's, and Lewis' Fords, to the right of Evans' demi-brigade, near the stone bridge, also under General Cooke's command. The latter held the stone bridge, and its left covered a farm ford about one mile above the bridge," according to Beauregard's official after-battle report. Although Cocke was a West Point graduate and wealthy planter, the regiment had long been under the practical command of Lieutenant Colonel John Bowie Strange, a VMI graduate who had founded the Albemarle Military Academy and who would die on campaign in 1862. Col. Strange had his men dig trenches to fortify their position the previous night.

According to William Wood's reminiscences, the 19th came under artillery fire on the morning of the 21st while waiting in the trenches for orders. Colonel Strange called out to his sergeant major during the fire "Lipop! I am without orders, What shall I do?" to which Sergeant Major Lipop replied "Retreat to Manassas as quickly as possible." Colonel Strange ignored the recommendation, and soon enough orders arrived saying that the 19th was to move out. As the regiment moved into position, a stray bullet killed a man in one of the Amherst companies, Private George Thompson, the 19th's first battle death. Thompson had been a farmer before the war, and the bullet entered his head. He was 21 years old. Five more men were wounded as the 19th deployed in time to see the Federal Army routed from the field. Although few, if any, men of the 19th actually fired their weapons during the battle, the regiment would forever say that First Manassas was their official trial by fire.

As the Federals retreated, the 19th chased them, advancing up a road to Sudley Ford, and there crossed the Bull Run. Afterwards, the chase ended, and the 19th returned to Lewis Ford by the way of the Federal retreat, covered by blankets, oilclothes, overcoats, haversacks, and muskets abandoned by Federal troops.

=== August 1861 – April 1862 ===
Like much of the Confederate Army after First Manassas, the 19th spent the rest of the year and part of the next in a stationary position around Cub Run. There the men learned how to drill and live like soldiers. They took their turn on the picket line and were occasionally involved in skirmishes. Camplife became the order of business, as they set up winter camp near Fairfax Court House, Virginia, in October, 1861. Companies and battalion drill were frequent, as were inspections and parades. The soldiers enjoyed the uneventful days of winter camp. Along with card playing and sport playing, they enjoyed the sermons of Reverend John H. Griffin of Company H. Griffin soon became the regimental chaplain. Along with picket duty and drill, the 19th also built entrenchments on the high points around Fairfax. Private Z.L. Gilmer of Company described the 19th positions as "impenentrable to the enemy," and noted in his diary that the slaves who also took part were paid the same as the soldiers (11.00 dollars). In January, 1862, the 19th performed picket duty every 16 days, with each wing alternating on the eighth day. While on picket duty, Philip St. George Cocke was given leave on December 16, and went home to his father's home at Bremo Bluff, in Fluvanna County. He never returned to his command, as on December 26, 1861, he committed suicide by a single shot from a pistol into his mouth. John Strange was sick in the hospital, so Colonel Armistead Rust took command of the regiment, but soon, he was given leave home, so Captain James Mallory of Company A took command of the regiment until Strange's return.

Like Washington's army after the winter at Valley Forge, the Confederate army and the 19th Virginia emerged in the spring a well-drilled force to be reckoned with. The regiment broke winter quarters on March 8, 1862, and marched south toward Culpeper. They camped outside Warrenton, Virginia, on March 10, then at Amissville on the 12th. They halted at Orange Court House on March 16. The 19th had marched 100 miles over the past two weeks, minus five days of rest. During the next two weeks, the 19th was drilled hard by Lieutenant Colonel Strange. While at camp at Orange, new recruits arrived to the regiment. Company I reported to have received 22 new recruits. Private William H. Jones wrote in a letter to his wife that, "camp life is a very hard life to one that is not bin(been) used to it..." On April 6, the 19th moved out, marching south to Louisa. They pass through Louisa Court House, on April 10, where some new recruits joined Company C. On April 16, the regiment arrived on the Richmond line for the purpose of defending the Confederate capitol against the advance of Federal Major General George B. McClellan's Army of the Potomac, which was preparing for its advance up the York Peninsula. After First Manassas, the Confederate Army of the Potomac was reorganized and renamed the Army of Northern Virginia under the command of General Joseph E. Johnston. After the suicide of General Cocke on December 26, 1861, the 19th Virginia was brigaded with the 8th, 18th, and 28th Virginia Infantry Regiments and the brigade was placed under the command of Brigadier General George Pickett and designated the Third Brigade of the Second Division, which was commanded by Major General James Longstreet. The 19th loaded "three schooners" and were shipped to Yorktown

On April 26, 1862, Companies B and E were attacked by Federal troops near Yorktown, Virginia. One man was killed and 15 captured from Company E and no men lost from Company B. They were replaced by Companies A and I the next day. They evacuated their positions on April 29, being replaced by the 19th Mississippi.

From April 28 to 30, the 19th Virginia was reorganized and company elections were held. Lieutenant Colonel John B. Strange replaced Rust as colonel, and Major Henry Gantt was promoted to lieutenant colonel.

=== Williamsburg ===
On May 5, the 19th Virginia was positioned near Fort Magruder, the strongest point on the Confederate defensive line intended to slow the advance of McClellan's army east of Williamsburg, Virginia. At 10:30 am, General George Pickett's brigade was ordered to relieve General Cadmus Wilcox brigade's right. The objective of Pickett's brigade was to extend the line well to the right of the Federal's flank and turn it. The brigade, including the 19th, drove the Federals to a pine thicket. The 19th then faced to the east, with the 18th Virginia to the left, and the 19th Mississippi and 17th Virginia to the left, and the 28th Virginia came up in reserve The 19th then came under heavy fire from the Federals in the pine thicket. The 19th began to fall back, but General Pickett and Lieutenant Colonel Gantt rallied the men and ordered them up. Later in the day, the 19th fixed bayonets and charged the Federal position. The Federal troops were driven by Pickett's men for a mile. During the charge, the 19th captured a battery of seven guns and over 200 Federals. One of the men to reach the guns first, Sergeant Alexander Hoffman of Company A, was killed beside the guns. The charge was the first time that Pickett's brigade would advance as a unit in attack. The relatively green 19th had passed its first major combat test in what some considered the 19th's proudest moment of the entire War.

After 8 pm, the 19th returned to Williamsburg and stayed there for the night. Pickett's brigade reported 190 casualties: 26 killed, 138 wounded and 26 missing. The 19th had 7 men killed, 44 wounded, and 2 missing.

=== Seven Pines ===
The Battle of Seven Pines began on May 31, 1862. Pickett's brigade was not involved, even though much of Longstreet's division was engaged. At 8:00 AM on June 1, the 19th Virginia formed up and prepared for action. The regiment stacked its arms and waited for orders, when a volley fired their direction sent them scurrying back into formation. Pickett's brigade advanced toward the direction of the shots. The 19th was halted and ordered to lie down and maintain silence when a large body of Federal infantry was found completely behind them, while another body of Federals advanced directly to their front. Assuming themselves surrounded, the 19th lay still and waited until the Federals to their front were nearly on top of them before they stood and delivered a volley that stopped the Federals cold. In less than "eight minutes," as William Wood would later carefully note, the Federal line fell back at a "quick route step." But although victorious in their fight, Wood would write that "on no future occasion was our loss so great in so short a time."

During the battle, the 19th was attacked by another Federal force. A Union officer walked in front of the units, and shouted to the Confederates, "Who are you all!" "Virginians, Virginians," they answered. "Don't worry, they will surrender", the Union officer said to his men. The 19th, insulted by this comment, rose up and fired a volley into the Federals, killing the officer, who is believed to be Colonel James Miller of the 81st Pennsylvania Volunteers. At 1 pm, Pickett's brigade withdrew back to the previous night's encampment. The 19th lost 20 percent of its strength.

=== Gaines' Mill ===
At 7:00 PM on June 27, Longstreet's division advanced on the far right of the Confederate line against Fitz John Porter's V Federal Corps. The 19th was in the front line of Longstreet's attack and on the left flank of the brigade. As it advanced, elements of the regiment temporarily stopped due to the viciousness of the Federal fire, but were quickly rallied and sent forward again. The regiment helped break the strong Federal line and drive it back in considerable confusion. A counter-charge by Federal cavalry was met by the 19th at bayonet point and driven back by point-blank rifle-fire delivered by Longstreet's division. Losses were heavy, but again the 19th and the rest of Pickett's brigade had performed admirably, with General Longstreet later taking note of the courage of Pickett's brigade in his memoirs, From Manassas to Appomattox. General Pickett was wounded in the attack, and Colonel Eppa Hunton of the 8th Virginia took control of the brigade (though some reports indicate Colonel Strange of the 19th Virginia took temporary command).

=== Frayser's Farm (Fraiser's Farm/Glendale) ===
The 19th advanced with the rest of Pickett's (now Hunton's) brigade on June 30, until it made contact with Federal infantry to its front. After a short fire-fight, the Federals were driven back. Colonel Strange apparently took temporary command of the brigade during this advance.

=== Second Manassas ===
After the threat to Richmond was repulsed with the withdrawal of McClellan's army from the Peninsula, Confederate General Robert E. Lee, who had since replaced Joseph Johnston after the latter's wounding at Seven Pines, reorganized his Army of Northern Virginia into two "wings" or "commands," under the command of Major General Longstreet (right wing) and Major General Thomas J. "Stonewall" Jackson (left wing). Hunton's brigade was placed in Longstreet's Command in the division commanded by Brigadier General James Kemper.

Kemper's division participated in Longstreet's march through Thoroughfare Gap which united Jackson's Command with Longstreet's on the battlefield of July 21, 1861, north of Manassas Junction. On August 30, at 4:00 PM, Longstreet's Command descended on Union Army of Virginia commander John Pope's exposed left flank. Hunton's brigade participated in the attack which virtually annihilated Union Colonel G. K. Warren's New York Brigade. The brigade then drove on, and helped drive Union reinforcements off Chinn Ridge. About 100 men were killed or wounded, among them was Lieutenant Colonel Henry Gantt.

=== Boonsborough ===
Hunton's brigade crossed the Potomac and participated in the Maryland Campaign of 1862. Soon after the crossing, Brigadier General Richard Brooke Garnett received command of the brigade from Colonel Hunton near Monocacy, Maryland. The 19th Virginia began the campaign with 150 men and officers, a substantially smaller number than the 800 they had taken to First Manassas hardly 15 months earlier. This smaller figure was due to battle casualties as well as disease and heavy rates of desertion prior to crossing the Potomac into Maryland.

The brigade took position on the east side of South Mountain near Turner's Gap on September 14, 1862, and was suddenly attacked by infantry and artillery from Joseph Hooker's I Corps. After a fight that lasted for over an hour, the 19th fell back with the rest of Garnett's brigade. Of the 150 men of the 19th who had begun the battle, 63 had fallen by nightfall, including the regiment's commander, Colonel Strange. Captain John L. Cochrane took command of the battered regiment, which retreated to Sharpsburg with the rest of Longstreet's Command.

=== Antietam/Sharpsburg ===
Garnet's brigade was posted on Cemetery Hill, just east of the town of Sharpsburg, Maryland, on the morning of September 17. Garnett's entire brigade could boast a mere 250 men, the 19th making up one-fifth of that figure. Throughout the day the regiment and Garnett's brigade received a steady bombardment from Federal artillery across Antietam Creek, until elements of George Sykes' Division crossed the creek and attacked the hill. The regiment, commanded by Captain B. Brown and Lieutenant William N. Wood (the author of Reminiscences of Big I) held its position for 2 hours, even though its men were spread out in a skirmish line formation. At about 3:30 PM, the brigade was ordered to retreat, which was done rapidly, as Federals had nearly surrounded Garnett's position. The brigade re-formed at the western base of the hill and prepared for a final stand, but Confederate reinforcements under A. P. Hill arrived in time to stall the Federal advance in other quarters, distracting the Federals from advancing on Garnett's weak line. The 19th Virginia suffered 8 casualties during its defense of Cemetery Hill out of a total strength of 50 men. The day after the battle, so many stragglers returned to the brigade that it marched back atop Cemetery Hill with nearly twice as many men as it had the previous day. The command withdrew with the rest of the army on September 18 through 19 back into Virginia.

=== Fredericksburg ===
After Sharpsburg, George Pickett had sufficiently recovered from his Gaines' Mill wounding to take command of Kemper's division. The division was posted in the center of the Confederate lines during the Battle of Fredericksburg from December 11–14, 1862, but did not participate in the fighting.

=== Suffolk ===
In early April, 1863, Pickett's division was detached from the Army of Northern Virginia and sent with General Longstreet on a three-fold mission in south-eastern Virginia. The first purpose: to gather supplies and forage from the area. Two: to protect Richmond from Federal forces threatening the city. Three: to capture the Federal garrison at Suffolk, Virginia. Longstreet succeeded in the first two purposes, but ultimately failed to destroy or capture the Federal army in the area.

On the division's return through Richmond, many of its men were reissued clothing and supplies, such as belts, shoes, socks, and coats. Since military woolen blankets were in short supply, many men were issued sections of carpet or rug that the quartermaster had in plenty. Thus Pickett's division, and the 19th Virginia, marched into Pennsylvania better clothed than many men in Lee's Army.

=== Gettysburg ===
Pickett's division marched with Longstreet's First Army Corps into Pennsylvania with the rest of Lee's Army of Northern Virginia in June 1863. At the rear of Longstreet's column of march, Pickett's division was marching toward the battlefield on July 1, and arrived in the afternoon of July 2 on the field of battle, where Pickett was told to rest his men as they would not be needed that day.

==== Pickett's Charge ====
On July 3, as the Confederate artillery prepared for the bombardment of the Federal lines in preparation for an assault by the infantry, the 19th Virginia took positions on Seminary Ridge just north of the Spangler House along with the rest of Garnett's brigade. Pickett's division, one of three that would participate in the assault, was deployed with Garnett's brigade in the front line on the left of the division, Kemper's brigade on the right of the division, and Armistead's brigade in the second line supporting Garnett. The 19th was deployed in the center of Garnett's brigade, considered a position of honor. As the artillery bombardment commenced and the fire returned by the Federal artillery, the Confederates hugged the ground on the slope of Seminary Ridge and waited for the order to advance. Federal artillery on Little Round Top fired shots that enfiladed the Confederate line, causing terrible damage. One such round killed the 19th's lieutenant colonel, John Thomas Ellis, as he lay snoozing on his back. As the shot bounced off the ground toward the 19th's ranks, someone yelled, "Look out!" Alarmed, Ellis sat upright just as the ball was about to sail harmlessly over his head. The ball hit him squarely in the face; Lieutenant Colonel E. Porter Alexander declared he "never saw so much blood fly." Greiving men carried the bloodied Ellis to the field hospital at the Currin Farm where soon died and was buried under an apple tree.

At roughly 2:30 PM, the attack commenced, led by General Pickett, who rode along his line shouting, "Up, men, and to your posts! Let no man forget that you are from Virginia!" General Garnett formed his men for the attack and led them out of the treeline on Seminary Ridge. General Garnett was mounted; he had been recently kicked by a horse and was unable to walk without difficulty. Although he could easily have turned over command and sat out the charge, Garnett was desperate to clear his reputation after being court-martialed by Stonewall Jackson for an unauthorized withdrawal of his command at the Battle of Kernstown in 1862 (in reality, Garnett's withdrawal was entirely practical; his men were low on ammunition and his line about to be overwhelmed.) Still, Garnett believed the only way to clear his name was to lead the attack from the front and center.

As Federal artillery opened long-range fire on the Confederate lines, the 19th Virginia suffered a critical command loss. Early in the assault, the 19th's commanding officer, Colonel Henry Gantt, was severely wounded in either the jaw or shoulder (reports and accounts differ as to the location of the wound), forcing Gantt to stumble to the rear for assistance. Command was turned over to Major Charles S. Peyton (second in command Lieutenant Colonel Ellis being killed as previously mentioned).

As the 19th advanced at the center of Garnett's brigade, there was apparently little rush or confusion during the advance across the mile-wide field. Lieutenant Wood wrote in his Reminiscences: "Onward we move in common marching time. No excitement. No loud commands. 'Steady, boys,' 'Don't fire,' 'Close up,' 'Never mind the skirmish line,' as that of the enemy hastened to shelter." After crossing the Emmitsburg Road, the 19th continued toward the Federal line, but then was subjected to severe rifle and short-range artillery fire from General Alexander Webb's "Philadelphia Brigade" of Pennsylvanians as well as Lieutenant Alonzo Cushing's remaining two guns of Battery A, 4th United States Artillery. Continuing forward in the face of devastating fire, the men of Garnett's brigade rushed headlong for the low stone wall protecting the position. By this time, all order had dissolved and the men of the brigade were rushing forward in a disorganized mass. Elements of the 19th helped force the withdrawal of the 71st Pennsylvania from its position just south of the Angle. Reinforced by Armistead's brigade, Garnett's left regiments (28th and 56th Virginia, and approximately the left half of the 19th Virginia) swarmed to within feet of the wall, where perhaps 200 of them were then led over the wall and into Cushing's Battery by General Armistead himself, who had raised his hat on the tip of his sword to guide the Confederates.

In Major Charles Peyton's official report of the battle, him being the senior officer of the brigade for some time after the battle, he reported that his line "recoiled under the terrific fire that poured into our ranks both from their batteries and their sheltered infantry." With much of Garnett's left smashed in front of Cushing's Battery in front of the stone wall, the right half of the brigade, including most of the 19th Virginia, engaged in a firefight with the 69th Pennsylvania directly to their front. The 69th was slowly driven back from the wall, maintaining a destructive fire on Garnett's advancing ranks all the while. Elements of the 19th reached the wall at this point, but few, if any, continued past the wall. To the 69th Pennsylvania's left (the right from the 19th's view) the 59th New York suddenly broke for the rear under pressure from Kemper's brigade in their front. Confederates, primarily from Kemper's brigade but perhaps including some men of the 19th Virginia, leaped over the wall and made a mad dash for Captain Andrew Cowan's 1st New York Independent Battery just south of the Clump of Trees. Cowan charged his guns with double canister and blasted a salvo in the face of the onrushing Confederates, completely obliterating the Confederates rushing the battery. Immediately, Federal reserves rushed into the melee. The 72nd Pennsylvania and elements of the 106th Pennsylvania engaged in a firefight with Armistead's Confederates that had crossed the wall at Cushing's Battery. The 42nd New York and 19th Massachusetts both rushed at a right oblique into any Confederates along the 69th Pennsylvania's and 59th New York's section of wall, and the 69th Pennsylvania refused to give any more ground upon falling back to the Clump of Trees. In addition, hundreds of Federals positioned elsewhere in the Federal lines spontaneously rushed forward, each wanting to participate in the Federal counterattack and to claim the capture of the many Confederates and their banners near the wall.

William Wood was slightly wounded in the leg just yards from the wall, probably by a spent round. Upon reaching the wall, Lieutenant Wood wrote that he: "...looked to the right and left and felt we were disgraced. Where were those who started in the charge? With one single exception I witnessed no cowardice, and yet we had not a skirmish line." Seeing large numbers of Federal troops moving in a wide flanking movement around the Confederates' right (Stannard's Second Vermont Brigade of the I Federal Corps), Wood realized that staying in place would mean capture, but retreat meant running the gauntlet of fire back across the field. Despite the risk, he chose the latter, and made it safely back across the field to Seminary Ridge, although being wounded by a ball that punctured his coat, vest, and shirt, but failed to penetrate his skin.

Many of the Confederates along the wall, including much of the 19th, were not so fortunate. General Armistead was struck down in the Federal lines near Cushing's guns; General Kemper was wounded, captured, but then taken back by his soldiers and carried to the rear; General Garnett was shot from his horse (reports vary as to his cause of death; most reports say a canister round blew him from his horse and tore his body to ribbons, but a report by a man in the 19th said that he was killed by a minie ball and fell dead from his horse. Either way, Garnett was killed at the front of the charge).

Years later, former Confederate General George H. "Maryland" Steuart would stumble upon General Garnett's sword in a Baltimore pawn shop. The sword is now in the collection of the Museum of the Confederacy. Another article in the museum's collection is the 19th Virginia's regimental battle flag (restored by the modern day re-enactors of the 19th VA Co B and Co K), captured during Pickett's Charge on July 3. Color bearer Polk Points was wounded in the charge, and gave the banner to an unidentified soldier who carried to the stone wall. Lore has it that this second color bearer was wounded and lying midst a pile of corpses on the east side of the stone wall. Sergeant Benjamin Falls and Corporal Joseph H. De Costro of the 19th Massachusetts saw a corner of a Confederate battle flag beneath a body and went forward as the firing died down to claim the valued prize of an enemy banner. Upon turning over the body they presumed to be a corpse to retrieve the flag, the "corpse" turned out to be the barely alive bearer of the 19th's flag. Falls tried to wrest the flag from the hands of the man, but the wounded Confederate refused to surrender the treasured banner. Falls threatened to run the man through if he did not surrender the flag. Apparently, it did not come to that, and Benjamin Falls and Joseph De Costro of the 19th Massachusetts thus captured the battle flag of the 19th Virginia. The men of the 19th Massachusetts, realizing the irony of capturing the flag of another "19th," cut out the "19th" from the Confederate banner and sew it onto their own flag. To this day, the 19th Virginia's regimental flag, preserved at the Museum of the Confederacy, is still void of a small rectangular piece where the "19th" was cut out by the Massachusetts men.

Although soundly beaten, the Confederates reformed behind Seminary Ridge. The 19th was badly cut up: its colonel and lieutenant colonel were both incapacitated, its flag captured, its major temporarily leading the brigade as all the other ranking field officers of the brigade were also incapacitated, and its numbers diminished.

==== Retreat from Gettysburg ====
The 19th returned with the rest of Pickett's division to Virginia via Williamsport. It was tasked with guarding prisoners on the march to the Potomac, where it was forced to wait several days due to the rising of the river.

=== August 1863 – May 1864 ===
For the next several months, Pickett's division was only lightly engaged. The 19th Virginia did not participate in another battle as a unit until the Battle of Cold Harbor in June 1864. During this time, many men of the 19th were sent on furlough or leave to visit their families back home. William Wood, on his furlough in late February 1864, actually fought independently in a small action near his homestead at the Skirmish at Rio Hill north of Charlottesville.

In late July 1863, Garnett's (now, again, Eppa Hunton's) Brigade marched to Culpeper. They then marched in early August to Somerville Ford south of the Rapidan in Orange County. On September 8, they marched for Chaffin's Farm seven miles east of Richmond. Wood described the next few months as "the most comfortable quarters we had occupied during the war." He described the winter encampment there as "jolly", although rations were "scarce", tempting some men to endeavor to cook a stray cat they found. After a full day of cooking, the cat had still not tenderized and, as Wood recalled, "the dinner was spoiled."

On May 22, 1864, the 19th marched from Chaffin's Farm to Anderson's Crossing, "where Pickett's Division was again united, and became once more an active arm of that grand army, whose fame, so honestly won, has been the admiration of the world."

=== Cold Harbor ===
On June 1, the 19th was subjected to shelling from Federal batteries near the Cold Harbor battlefield. Many men of the 19th dug comfortable rifle pits using their bayonets.

On the 2nd, the 19th advanced so that it was online with the rest of the army and prepared for action that was sure to come the next morning.

On the morning of June 3, the 19th formed a thin line of battle which covered twice the front of a regularly deployed regiment, its companies being spaced to cover a wider front. Company K under Lieutenant Robertson was advanced as a guard. Unlike much of the Confederate line, Hunton's brigade did not have the shelter of protective earthworks to help fend off the Yankee attack that morning. The Federals charged the 19th and the fighting in the woods the 19th was positioned in dissolved into a "bushwhacking affair."

In the hour-long fight that followed, Company K's officers would all become casualties and regimental Sergeant Major Luther Wolfe was killed. The most severe command blow was that of Captain James G. Woodson of Company K, who was killed while in command of the regiment. When the list of casualties published in the Richmond Examiner incorrectly stated Woodson as "acting major," Wood and several other officers of the regiment wrote the Enquirer to say that Woodson was in command of the regiment at the time of his death. This was to justify the memory of an officer as highly respected as Captain Woodson was.

=== Chester Station ===
On the 17th of June, the 19th was positioned near Petersburg to counter the moves made by Grant's army as it worked its way around Lee's right flank toward Petersburg. Company A, under Lieutenant Wood's command, was sent forward as skirmishers. After advancing several hundred yards, Wood sent a message back to ask for orders, but received no new instructions and was sent Company C under the command of Captain Charles Irving. Advancing further, the two companies encountered several Federals around a barn and drove them off with no fight. Wood and Irving agreed that to advance was the best tactic, and they came upon formidable earthworks to their front manned by Federals. Wood and Irving decided to charge this Federal line, and with only 40 men routed the Federals in the trenches with hardly a shot being fired. The rest of the regiment was called up and took position in the captured trenches the next morning. The brigade stayed in this position for "many months."

=== August 1864 - March 1865; "Howlett Line" ===
For months, the 19th was positioned in what Lieutenant Wood called, "the trenches on the Howlett line, extending from the James to the Appomattox..." The men made the trenches like home, constructing Masonic lodges and chapels, where apparently "many a soldier was born into the kingdom of Christ." The men hosted debating societies which pondered philosophical questions of the day. Chess clubs were formed as well, where "several men learned to play a good game of chess blindfolded." Newspaper correspondents were present as well. Reading clubs were formed. "Nearly every one played checkers," Wood wrote, "And not a few 'threw the papers' as card-playing was called." Wood kept a set of chess-men he constructed during this time and took them home after the war was over.

Athletics were also a common pastime. These included wrestling, running, jumping, and boxing.

Several marriages also occurred during this time between soldiers in the trenches and their visiting brides-to-be.

=== White Oak Road ===
On March 31, 1865, Hunton's brigade was moved to near Hatcher's Run outside Petersburg. Hunton's brigade was dispatched from the rest of the division. As it formed for battle, General Robert E. Lee personally oversaw the deployment of the brigade (or so Lieutenant Wood remembered). The brigade was advanced through some woods at the double-quick and drove back a Federal line. General Lee spurred his horse, Traveller, into the midst of the fighting, but the men of the 19th shouted "Don't go with us General, but watch us!"

After reforming in a pine thicket, the 19th blazed away at the Federals to their front. Lieutenant Wood and other officers picked up rifles and fought alongside the privates in an attempt to put as much firepower into the fight as they could muster. During this fight, Wood was wounded in the neck by a ball and hurried to the rear, where the wound was diagnosed as minor and dressed. Wood was soon sent back into the fight, although the scar from the wound remained visible for the rest of his life.

The 19th gradually fell back, having advanced far ahead of its supports, to near its original position where it had started the fight.

Hunton's brigade was not at the Battle of Five Forks with the rest of Pickett's division and "...consequently did not share the defeat of the war..." as Wood would later call that disastrous battle.

=== Retreat from Petersburg ===
Pickett's division participated in the withdrawal of the Confederate forces from Richmond and Petersburg on the evening of April 2 to the early morning hours of April 3. Wood recalled that it often took an hour to advance a single mile due to the terrible condition of the roads they were marching on. He described their daily rations as "unparched corn," but said that faith in General Lee never faltered and that their powder was kept dry, implying that they were still full of fight. On April 5, Wood, commanding Company A, dispatched two men to forage rations for the company from the surrounding countryside. Neither of these men returned.

=== Sayler's Creek/ Sailor's Creek ===
On April 6, 1865, the 19th halted its march on a hill overlooking what William Wood would later assume to be Sayler's Creek (or "Tayler's" Creek, as he calls it in the original manuscript). The men took this opportunity to cook some of their corn, but a fire had hardly been lit when Wood received orders to take his company and deploy them as skirmishers and drive a small body of Federals from some pines at the base of the hill. For the final time, the 19th Virginia formed a line of battle and, following Wood's Company A, marched down the hill into the thicket. After recapturing several pieces of artillery, the 19th continued on until they reached a road in a clearing. In front of them, thousands of Federal cavalrymen, probably from George A. Custer's Division, were forming for an attack. Rapidly preparing for the onslaught, the men of the 19th threw up a breastwork of fence rails in their front and prepared for the assault. Lieutenant Wood's account describes what happened next:

"I had just said to Dick McMullen, 'Be sure not to fire until they reach that mullein stalk,' when a commotion in the rear of our line caused me to look behind us, and to my dismay, my eyes rested upon the largest line of cavalry I had ever seen. There seemed to be no end to the line. There they stood in double ranks within forty feet of us. They were well mounted and admirably armed. How they got there in our immediate rear I know not, and from what direction they came I have never learned. The fact is, they were there in overpowering numbers, with pistol or gun ready to do damage upon the least show of resistance. Major [Waller M.] Boyd, commanding our regiment, quickly said: 'We are prisoners,' and that was the end of the Nineteenth Virginia Infantry as a body of armed soldiers."

The 19th surrendered en masse. How many men were in the 19th at this time is unknown. It was certainly no more than 200 men and probably less than half of that. Some individuals might have escaped, but as Wood states the 19th Virginia would never form an organized body of soldiers again.

=== Appomattox ===
While the 19th was captured as a unit at Sayler's Creek (along with their general, Eppa Hunton, and many more of his men), 29 men and 1 officer of the 19th Virginia Infantry were listed as having been paroled at Appomattox Court House with the rest of Lee's Army. Some of these men had been prisoners of war at Point Lookout in Maryland, and had only been released in March in an exchange. After being released from the Richmond hospital they joined back up with their troops and fought at Petersburg, Five Forks, Farmville and on to Appomattox. Most of these men had joined at the beginning in May 1861 and had served the entire war.

=== As prisoners of war ===
Like many of his comrades, Lieutenant Wood was sent to the Old Capitol Prison in Washington, DC, and was there when mobs formed outside the structure, demanding that they be let in to punish the prisoners within who were suspected of assassinating Abraham Lincoln on the evening of April 14, 1865. Wood was then sent to Johnson Island on Lake Erie. Since Wood and his comrades had surrendered before Lee surrendered at Appomattox, Wood and his comrades were not paroled and were treated as prisoners of war. Wood recalls that the prisoners were paroled by alphabetical order, meaning that he was among the last released.

When he was released in June 1865, and had no food or money to aid in his journey home except useless Confederate bills. Bartering some blankets for some United States money, Wood returned home by way of Cleveland (although he wrote that he returned through Milwaukee, which seems unlikely as that would be far out of his way), then to Baltimore, then to Richmond and on to Charlottesville, where he walked to his father's residence north of town. Many of the 19th's members performed similar odysseys on their way home after the war.

William Wood summed up the feelings of most ex-Confederate soldiers when he wrote, "I was glad to don clean citizen's clothes, that my mother had kept for me through the war, and to eat a good dinner. Though greatly crushed by the final outcome of our struggle, I felt proud that I had been permitted to do my part, and even to suffer for the cause I loved. Some comfort was derived from the contemplation that there would be no more blood shed; but peace, with all it meant to a tired soldier, was at hand."

== See also ==
- List of Virginia Civil War units
