= St. Emma Military Academy and St. Francis de Sales =

Two private schools in Powhatan County, Virginia, US (c. 1895–1972)

St. Emma Military Academy
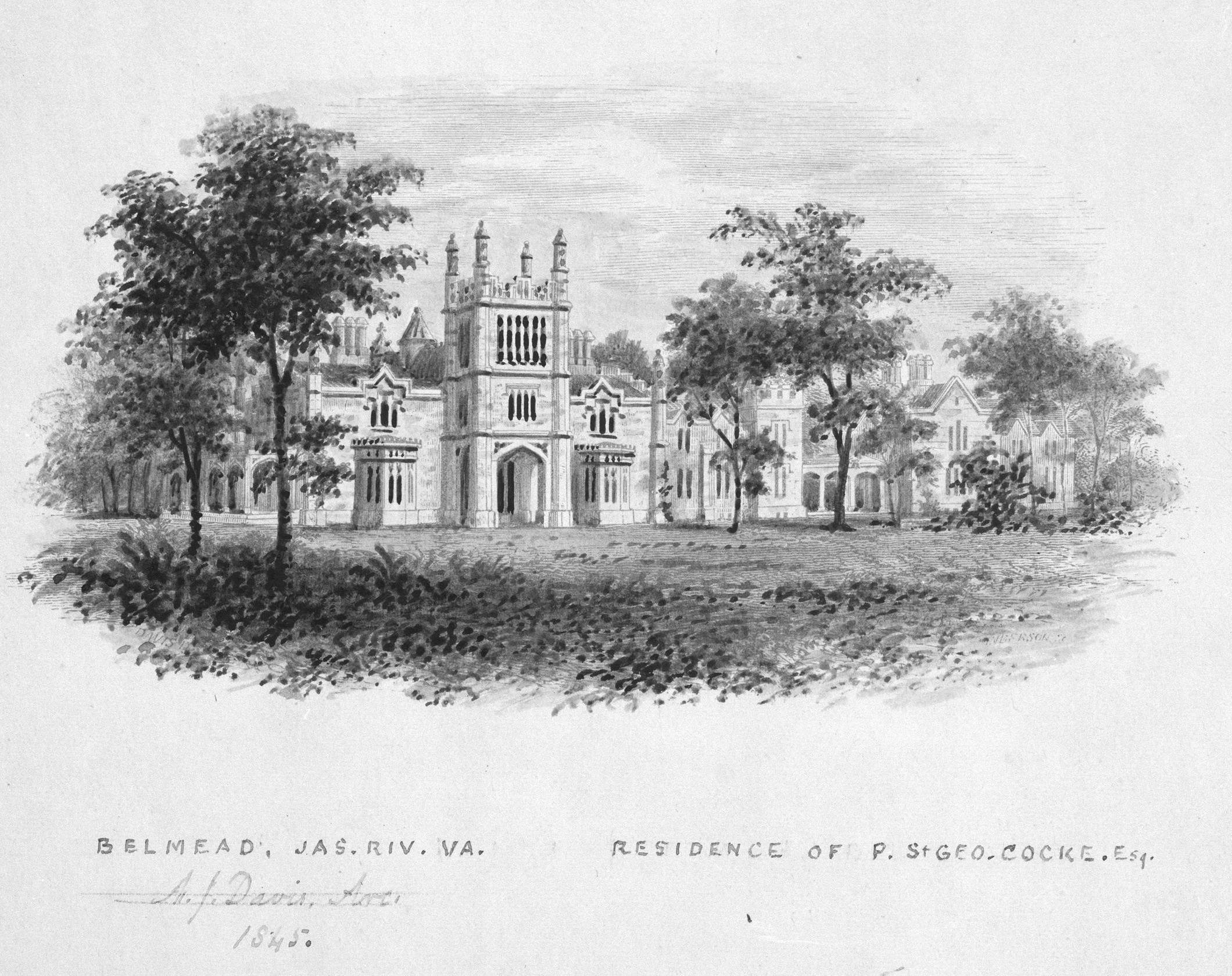
- Belmead in 1845, before St. Emma Military Academy

Location
- 3505 Belmead Road, NW of JCT of Rtes. 663 & 600, near Powhatan, Powhatan County, Virginia, U.S.
- 37°37′24″N 77°58′45″W

Information
- Other name: St. Emma Industrial and Agricultural Institute (1895–1946)
- Established: 1895
- Closed: 1972

St. Francis de Sales
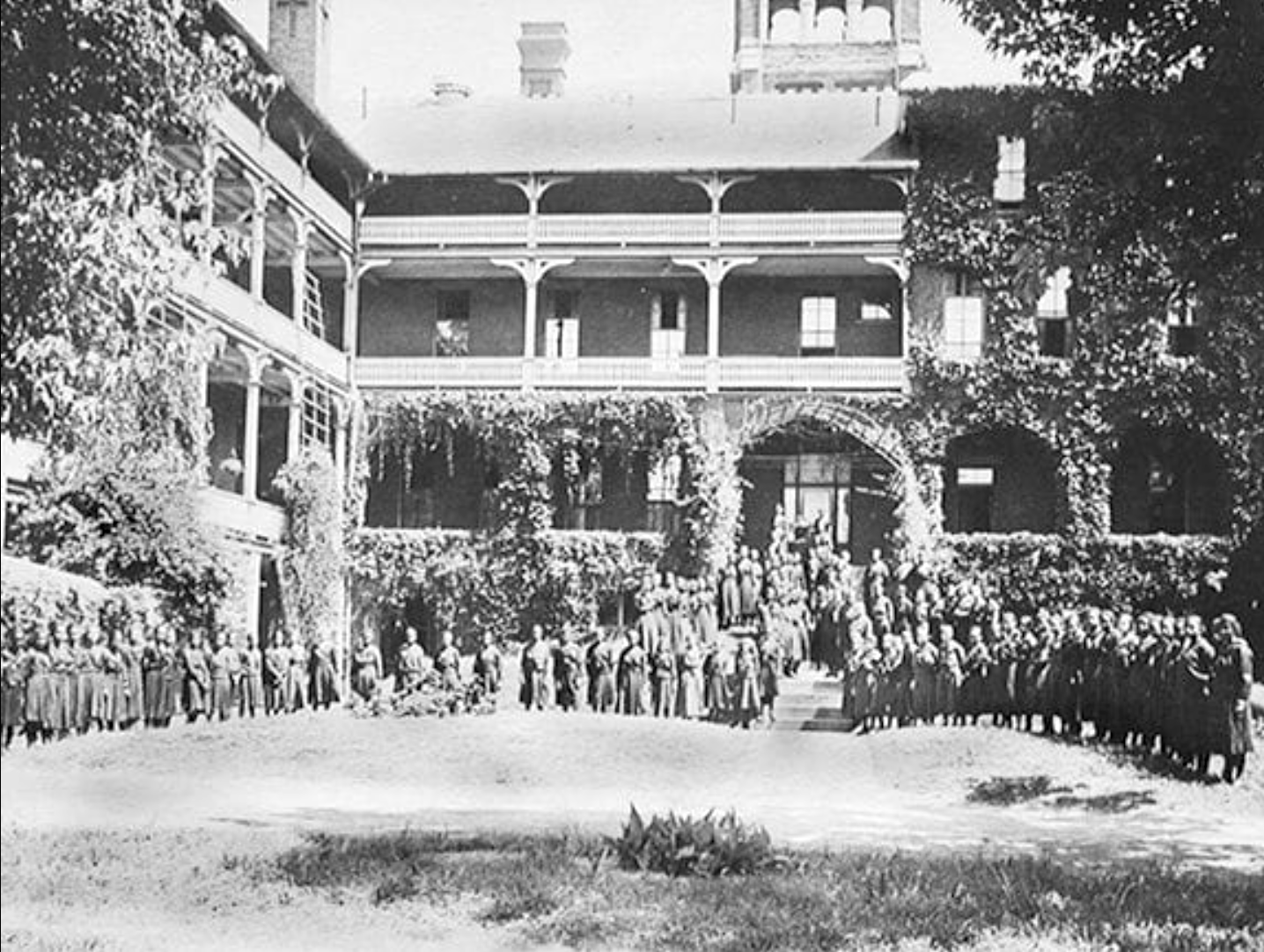
- St. Francis de Sales c. 1900

Location
- 3500 St. Emma Road near Powhatan, Powhatan County, Virginia, U.S.

Information
- Other names: "Rock Castle"
- Established: 1899
- Closed: 1970

St. Emma Military Academy, formerly known as St. Emma Industrial and Agricultural Institute, was a private boarding school for African American male students, constructed in 1895 in Powhatan County near Powhatan, Virginia, US. It shared a campus with St. Francis de Sales, a private boarding school for African American female students. The two school grounds are separated by a small creek. The schools were founded by Edward and Louise Morrell, in partnership with Katharine Drexel, and they had a Catholic religious affiliation.

== Pre-history ==
The main school building for St. Emma's Military Academy was a former plantation house for the Belmead plantation, designed as a two-story Gothic revival style by architect Alexander Jackson Davis for Philip St. George Cocke (1809–1861), and constructed about 1845. It was also known as Belmead-on-the-James, located on the James River, this was a working plantation with some 124 enslaved Black people who maintained the property. Some 130 formerly enslaved people were buried on the plantation land between 1835 and 1865.

After the American Civil War ended in 1865 the Belmead plantation was left vacant, and eventually it was purchased in 1895 by Louise Drexel Morrell, her husband Edward de Veaux Morrell.

A few years later in 1899, Katharine Drexel purchased the Mount Pleasant plantation across the river.

== Early years ==
These schools were started and sustained by three Philadelphian philanthropists; Louise Drexel Morrell, her husband Edward de Veaux Morrell, and sister, Katharine Drexel. Louise and Katharine were the daughters of Francis Anthony Drexel, a wealthy banker and the namesake of Drexel University. Upon his death, the daughters used their inheritance to help the disadvantaged and the disenfranchised youth of this country.

== History of St. Emma Military Academy ==
St. Emma Military Academy was founded as St. Emma Industrial and Agricultural Institute at 3505 Belmead Road. The school initially offered domestic skills and core academics. The students came from the United States, Africa and the Caribbean to attend. Additionally Native American students attended the school.

The Roman Catholic Congregation of the Holy Spirit (also known as the Holy Ghost Fathers) assumed control and operations of St. Emma in 1947, and changed the name to St. Emma Military Academy and making it the only military school for African Americans in Virginia. After the restructuring it was often referred to as the, "West Point of prep schools," emphasizing discipline, respect, teamwork, and leadership.

St. Emma Military Academy closed by 1972 due to declining enrollment and the advancement of integration among other things. The school had graduated over 10,000 young black men during its existence.

== History of St. Francis de Sales ==
Its sister school was St. Francis de Sales, a high school for African American and Native American female students, constructed in 1899, on the historic Mount Pleasant plantation at 3500 St. Emma Road. It was nicknamed "Rock Castle". Located on the eastern side of the Belmead property, St. Francis de Sales is approximately three quarters of a mile from the plantation-era mansion. This school was designed by Virginia architect C. L. Dodd Jr. Located in the northeast corner of the main building is the school's chapel, which was designed by Pennsylvania architect Henry Albert Roby, and has an interior clad in ornate marble. During the days of slavery the property could support around two hundred people.

Established by Katharine Drexel, the founder of the Sisters of the Blessed Sacrament, St. Francis provided a high school education for the girls. The building housed not only classrooms, parlors, and dining rooms but also dormitory rooms for both the students and sisters in charge of teaching. St. Francis de Sales closed in 1970.

== Closure and legacy ==
St. Francis de Sales closed in 1970, and St. Emma Military Academy closed in 1972. It is estimated some 15,000 to 20,000 students attended both schools during the years of operation. In the 1970s, several of the original structures from both of the schools were demolished, however the Belmead mansion and the main building and chapel of St. Francis de Sales are still intact, as well as a few other former school buildings.

The history of the two schools is documented in the book by Robert A. Walker Jr., The Black Military Academy on the James River: A Memoir of a True Story From 1895–2005 (2024).

== See also ==
- List of defunct military academies in the United States
