= Katharine Drexel =

American Catholic religious sister and saint (1858–1955)

Saint Katharine Drexel SBS

Virgin
- Born: Catherine Mary Drexel; November 26, 1858; Philadelphia, Pennsylvania, U.S.
- Died: March 3, 1955 (aged 96); Bensalem, Pennsylvania, U.S.
- Venerated in: Catholic Church
- Beatified: November 20, 1988 by Pope John Paul II
- Canonized: October 1, 2000 by John Paul II
- Major shrine: Cathedral Basilica of Saints Peter and Paul, Philadelphia
- Feast: March 3
- Patronage: Racial justice, philanthropists

Katharine Drexel, SBS (born Catherine Mary Drexel; November 26, 1858 – March 3, 1955) was an American Catholic religious sister. In 1891, she founded the Sisters of the Blessed Sacrament, a religious congregation serving Black and Indigenous Americans. Canonized by Pope John Paul II in 2000, Drexel was the second person born in the United States to be declared a saint and the first who was born a U.S. citizen.

== Early life ==
Catherine Marie Drexel was born on November 26, 1858, in Philadelphia, to Francis Anthony Drexel and Hannah Langstroth. She had an older sister, Elizabeth. The Drexel family was very wealthy, having made a fortune in banking. Her uncle, Anthony Joseph Drexel, founded Drexel Institute of Art, Science and Industry in Philadelphia. Today it is Drexel University. Katharine's maternal aunt served as mother superior of the Society of the Sacred Heart in the Torresdale section of Philadelphia.

The Drexel family lived on a 90 acres (36 ha) estate in Torresdale. It was named St. Michel, after Michael, the archangel. Hannah died five weeks after Catherine's birth. Her uncle Anthony and her aunt Ellen cared for her and Elizabeth for the next two years. In 1860, her father Francis married Emma Bouvier and brought the two girls home. The couple had a third daughter, Louise, in 1863.

Francis and Emma Drexel placed great value on their Catholic faith and its admonitions to help the poor. As a young girl, Catherine helped her stepmother distribute food and clothing at their home every week to needy people. James O'Connor, pastor of St. Dominic's Parish in the Holmesburg neighborhood, served as a spiritual advisor to Catherine as she grew older.

In 1876, O'Connor was appointed Vicar apostolic of Nebraska, covering large areas of the American West. When Catherine was age 15, the family traveled to Italy. She was allowed to attend an audience in Rome with Pope Pius IX, an experience that left a great impression on her.

When Catherine was in her twenties, Emma was diagnosed with cancer. Catherine nursed Emma for three years until her death.

== Religious congregation ==
=== Early philanthropy ===
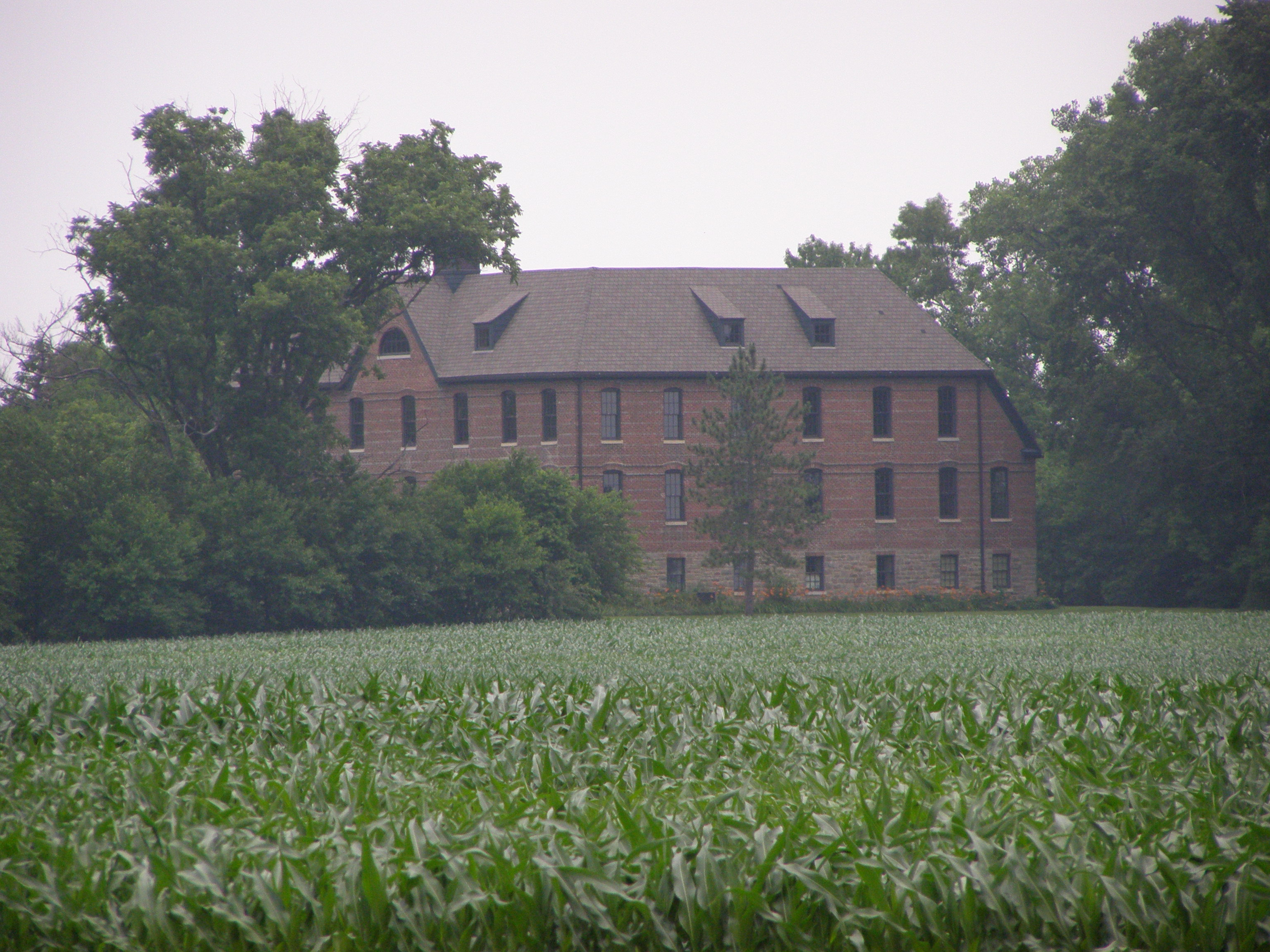
St. Joseph Indian School (2010)

Francis Drexel died in 1885, leaving a large amount of money to his daughters. At that point Drexel, supported by her sister Louise, decided to begin funding schools for Native Americans. That same year, Drexel donated money for the establishment of the St. Mary’s Indian Industrial School on the new Turtle Mountain Reservation in the Dakota Territory, providing an education to the Chippewa people. In 1886, she was granted an audience with Pope Leo XIII in Rome. During their meeting, she asked the pope to send more missionaries to the Western United States to minister to the Native Americans. In response, he asked her why she did not become a missionary herself.

Drexel visited O'Connor in Nebraska in 1887 and 1888; by then he was leading the new Diocese of Omaha. O'Connor took Drexel on a tour of several Indian reservations in the region so that she could see for herself the poverty and illiteracy of these people. Drexel founded the Kate Drexel Mission Boarding School at the Umatilla Reservation near Pendleton, Oregon, in 1887, educating the Umatilla, Walla Walla, and Cayuse peoples. The next year, she established the St. John's School for Osage Indian Boys in Blackburn, Oklahoma. Also in 1888, she financed the opening of the St. Joseph Indian Normal School in Rensselaer, Indiana.

=== Founding of Sisters of the Blessed Sacrament ===
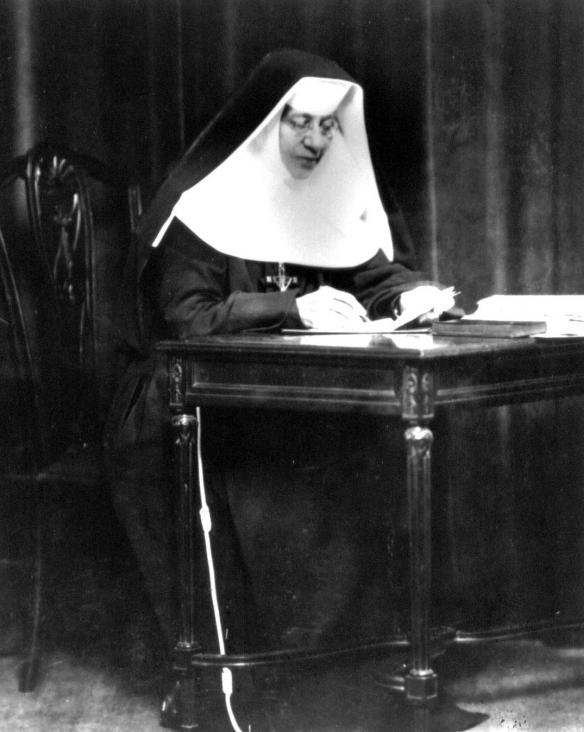
Mother Drexel (circa 1915)

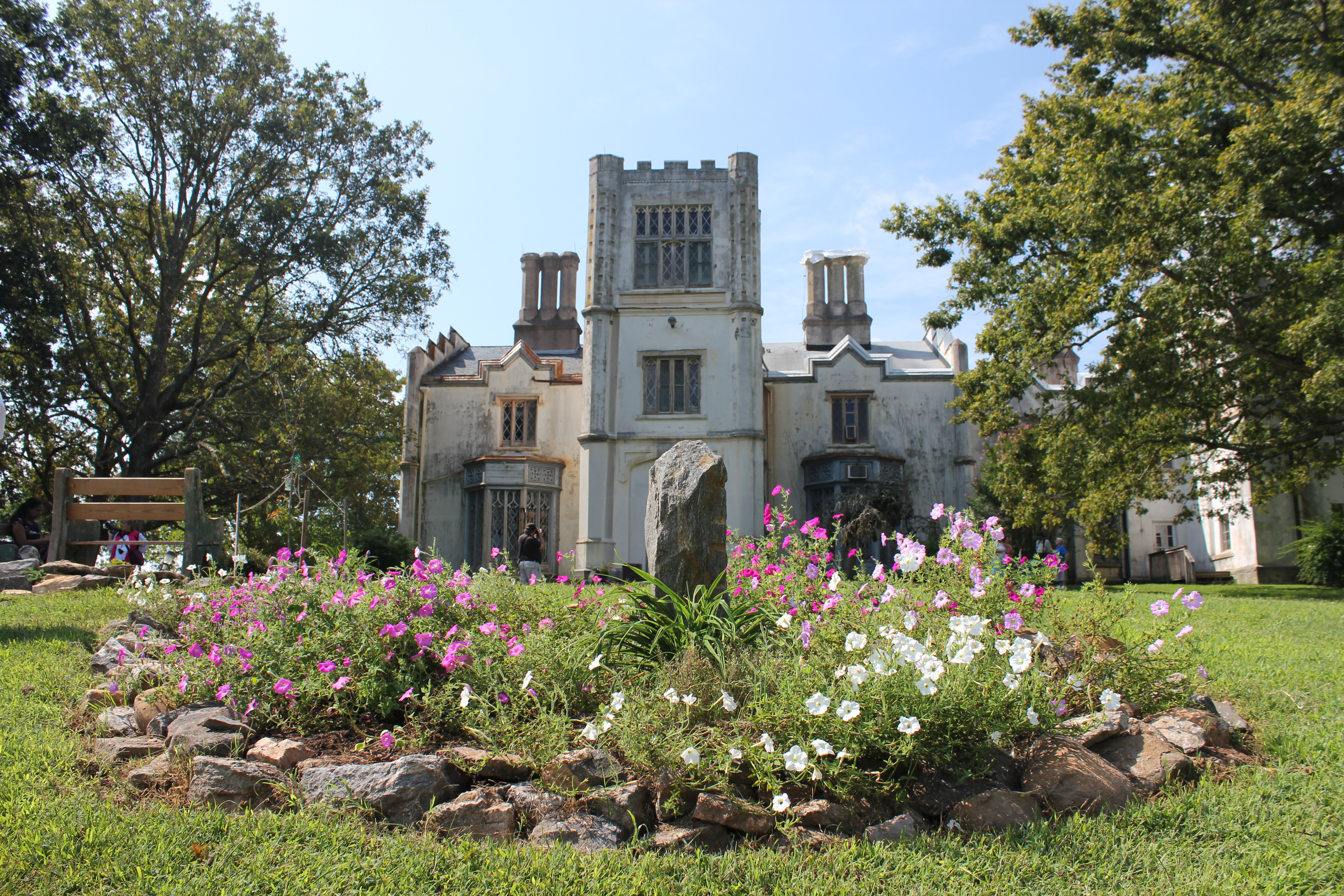
Belmead mansion (2012)

In 1889, Drexel decided to follow Leo XIII's advice and become a missionary herself. She entered a convent of the Sisters of Mercy. In February 1891, she founded the Congregation of the Sisters of the Blessed Sacrament for Indians and Colored People (SBS). While still supporting missions for Native Americans, Drexel started building institutions for African-Americans.

Many of the women who entered SBS were Irish Americans or Irish immigrants. Although Drexel was not Irish, she had grown up with many Irish servants and religious figures and had a high opinion of their work ethic and goodness. She sent many of them to classes at Drexel University and the University of Pennsylvania. She was vigilant in determining that recruits did not harbor racial prejudices.

Drexel only accepted White women into the SBS. In a 1991 article in Catholic American Studies, Raymond H. Schmandt theorized that Drexel did not want to compete with existing African-American religious congregations for candidates, and she believed a racially integrated religious SBS would only amplify the existing animosity against both Catholics and African-Americans. Finally, there were Jim Crow laws in the American South that prohibited different races from living together.

Louise purchased Belmead Plantation, a vacant estate in Powhatan, Virginia, in 1895. Working with Drexel, they opened the St. Emma Industrial and Agricultural Institute for boys in 1895 and the St. Francis de Sales School for girls in 1899.

The Dominican Sisters of St. Catherine de' Ricci opened an orphanage in Havana, in 1901 to care for Afro-Cuban children who had lost their parents due to the 1898 Spanish–American War. Despite the sisters' efforts, they received no donations from the Cuban government or private individuals for their project. However, Drexel gave them a donation to keep the orphanage solvent.

In 1907, Frances Xavier Cabrini, the founder of the Missionary Sisters of the Sacred Heart of Jesus, stopped in Philadelphia to dine with Drexel. During the 19th century, Cabrini had established schools and hospitals throughout the United States for poor Italian immigrants. She had wanted to personally thank Drexel for her helping an MSC sister in Philadelphia. In a very amiable conversation, Drexel told Cabrini that the Vatican bureaucracy was stymieing her religious congregation on a legal matter. Believing in direct action, Cabrini told her to personally go to Rome and remain there until the Vatican resolved the problem. Drexel took her advice and succeeded in her mission.

In 1915, Archbishop James Blenk of the Archdiocese of New Orleans asked Drexel to come to New Orleans, to open a high school for African-American youth. She bought the former site of Southern University and opened Xavier High School. Two years later, she helped with the addition of a normal school for training teachers. Both schools became Xavier University of Louisiana.

In 1937, Drexel suffered a severe heart attack, forcing her to resign as superior. Her activities were limited for the remainder of her life. Drexel died at age 96 on March 3, 1955, at St. Elizabeth’s Convent in Bensalem Township, Pennsylvania. By that time, most of her fortune had been depleted. Drexel was buried in Bensalem Township, Pennsylvania at St. Elizabeth's Convent. In August 2018, Drexel's remains were transferred to a new shrine at the Cathedral Basilica of Saints Peter and Paul in Philadelphia.

== Awards and accolades ==
She had received the following awards and accolades:

- DeSmet Medal – Gonzaga University, Spokane, Washington (1938)
- Catholic Action Medal – Knights of Columbus, Santo Domingo Council, Philadelphia (1938)
- Award and scroll – Catholic Committee of the South (1942)
- Honneur et Merite Medal – Republic of Haiti (1942)
- Siena Medal – Theta Phi Alpha social fraternity (1943)

== Veneration ==
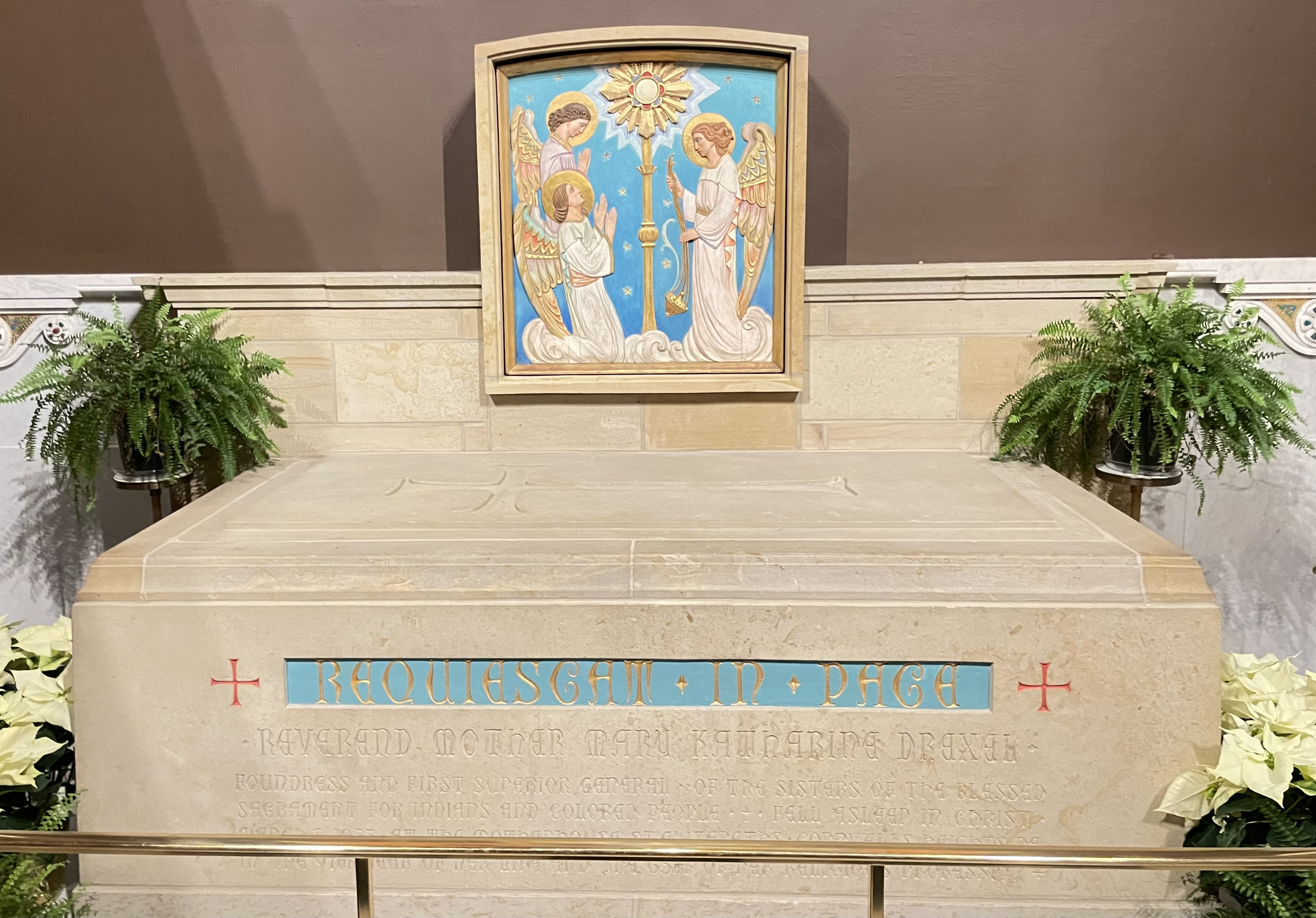
Tomb of Katharine Drexel in the Cathedral Basilica of Saints Peter and Paul (Philadelphia)

In 1974, 14-year-old Robert Gutherman was living in Bensalem when he developed severe pain in his right ear. His brothers did janitorial work at the motherhouse of Sisters of the Blessed Sacrament. That inspired his sister to suggest the family all pray for Drexel's intercession to help Gutherman heal. After being hospitalized, doctors told Gutherman that he would be permanently deaf in his right ear. However, a few days later, the hearing was restored to his right ear. His doctors could not come up with any medical explanation for the cure.

Drexel was beatified by Pope John Paul II on November 20, 1988, when the first miracle attributed to her intercession, the Gutherman healing, was confirmed. She was canonized on October 1, 2000, when the 1994 miracle reversing congenital deafness in two-year-old Amy Wall was recognized. Her feast day is observed on March 3, the anniversary of her death.

A second-class relic of Drexel is located inside the altar of the Mary chapel at St. Raphael the Archangel Catholic Church in Raleigh, North Carolina. Another relic resides in the day chapel of Saint Katharine Drexel Parish in Sugar Grove, Illinois.

Bishop Robert Barron said this about Drexel in 2008:

"Katharine’s natural sense of moderation and self-control became a supernaturalized temperance, and her ordinary sense of fairness became elevated justice, a desire to render to the other even beyond what is his due. Since all here below is passing, she must give all to the demands of the eternal. The great irony, of course, is that this insight came to her just after an enormous sum of money—that which could buy her all of the goods of the ephemeral world—fell under her control.

In 2025, Pope Leo XIV noted Drexel as an example of those who, during their lives,

"...discovered that the poorest are not only objects of our compassion, but teachers of the Gospel. It is not a question of 'bringing' God to them, but of encountering [God] among them."

== Legacy ==
=== Schools founded or funded by Drexel ===
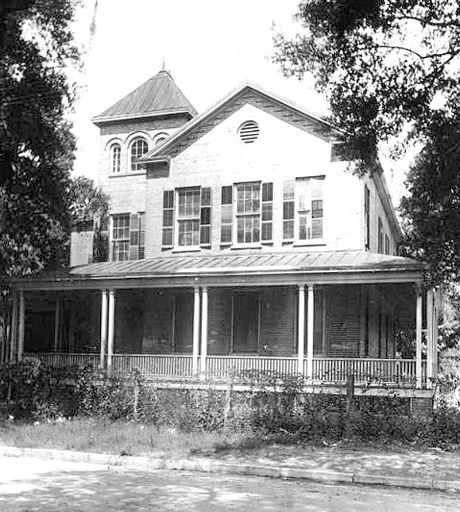
St. Benedict the Moor School, St. Augustine, Florida (1900)

- St. Mary's Indian Industrial School – Turtle Mountain Reservation, Belcourt, North Dakota (1885 to 1910)
- Kate Drexel Mission Boarding School – Umatilla Reservation, Pendleton, Oregon (1887 to 1937)
- St. John's School for Osage Indian Boys – Blackburn, Oklahoma (1888 to 1913).
- St. Joseph Indian Normal School – St. Joseph's College, Rensselaer, Indiana (1888 to 1896). See page 350 of cited source
- St. Emma Industrial and Agricultural Institute – Belmead Plantation, Powhatan, Virginia (later St. Emma Military Academy). Founded in 1895
- St. Benedict the Moor School – St. Augustine, Florida. Originally called St. Cecelia, founded in 1898
- St. Teresa’s Institute for Creek Indian Girls – Tulsa, Oklahoma. Founded in 1899
- St. Francis de Sales School – Belmead Plantation, founded in 1899
- St. Michael Indian School – St. Michaels, Arizona. Founded in 1902
- St. Peter Claver Catholic School – Macon, Georgia. Founded in 1903
- St. Mark the Evangelist School – Harlem, New York City. Founded in 1912, first school for African-American Catholic children in the city
- Our Lady of Lourdes Catholic Church and School – Atlanta, Georgia. Founded in 1912
- Xavier University of Louisiana – New Orleans. Founded in 1915
- Blessed Sacrament Catholic School – Beaumont, Texas. Founded in 1917
- St. Edward School – New Iberia, Louisiana. Founded in 1918
- St. Ignatius of Loyola School – Philadelphia. Founded in 1926, moved to Philadelphia in 1967
- Sacred Heart Catholic School – Port Arthur, Texas. Founded in 1927
- St. Vincent De Paul Catholic Church and School – Nashville, Tennessee. Founded in 1932

== Places and honors named for Drexel ==
=== Awards ===
- Katharine Drexel Award in Catholic Philanthropy, Fadica Catholic Philanthropy Network – honors philanthropists who advocate for Catholic ministries.
- St. Katharine Drexel Award, Catholic Library Association – honors librarians who make a significant contribution to high school libraries.
- St. Katherine Drexel Award, Archdiocese of Louisville – honors outstanding primary school teachers.
- St. Katharine Drexel National Justice Award, Sisters of the Blessed Sacrament – honors individuals living a religious life who fight injustice and help the poor of all races.

==== Parishes and churches ====
- Ascension Parish and St. Katharine Drexel Parish – Forest City, Pennsylvania
- Catholic Church of St. Katharine Drexel – Ramsey, Minnesota
- Church of St. Katharine Drexel – Egg Harbor Township, New Jersey
- St. Katharine Drexel Catholic Church – Sugar Grove, Illinois
- St. Katharine Drexel Catholic Church – Frederick, Maryland
- St. Katharine Drexel Catholic Church – Chester, Pennsylvania
- St. Katharine Drexel Catholic Parish – Martell, California
- St. Katharine Drexel Catholic Parish – Weston, Florida
- St. Katharine Drexel Catholic Parish – Springfield, Illinois
- St. Katharine Drexel Catholic Parish, Greater East Buffalo Family of Parishes – Buffalo, New York
- St. Katharine Drexel Catholic Parish – Beaver Dam, Wisconsin
- St. Katharine Drexel Church, Our Lady of the Lake Catholic Parish – Cascade, Idaho
- St. Katharine Drexel Church – Boston, Massachusetts
- St. Katharine Drexel Parish – Alton, New Hampshire
- St. Katharine Drexel Parish – Cape Coral, Florida
- St. Katharine Drexel Parish – New Orleans, Louisiana
- St. Katherine Drexel Parish, Catholic Parishes of Western Wayne County – Macedon, New York
- St. Katharine Drexel Parish – Bentleyville, Pennsylvania
- St. Katharine Drexel Parish – Burlington, New Jersey
- St. Katharine Drexel Parish, St. Joseph Parish of the Panther Valley – Lansford, Pennsylvania
- St. Katharine Drexel Parish – Mechanicsburg, Pennsylvania
- St. Katharine Drexel Roman Catholic Church – Hempstead, Texas
- St. Katharine Drexel-St. Francis Church, Kaukauna Catholic Parishes – Kaukauna, Wisconsin

==== Missions, shrines and chapels ====
- St. Joseph's Shrine of St. Katharine Drexel – Columbia, Virginia
- St. Katharine Drexel Chapel, Drexel University – Philadelphia, Pennsylvania
- St. Katharine Drexel Chapel – Xavier University of Louisiana – New Orleans, Louisiana
- Katharine-Drexel Kapelle – Dornbirn, Austria
- St. Katharine Drexel Mission – Haymarket, Virginia
- St. Katharine Drexel Mission – Maple, North Carolina
- St. Katharine Drexel Mission – Trenton, Georgia
- St. Katharine Drexel Summer Chapel, All Saints Parish – Harpswell, Maine

==== Schools ====
- Katharine Drexel Early Childhood Education Center – Broussard, Louisiana
- Saints Katharine Drexel and Isidore Chapel, Sampiniton, Jimalalud, Negros Oriental, Philippines
- St. Katharine Drexel Academy – San Diego, California. (2018 to 2025)
- St. Katherine Drexel Catholic High School – Stouffville, Ontario
- St. Katharine Drexel Elementary School – Sioux Falls, South Dakota
- St. Katharine Drexel Preparatory School – New Orleans
- St. Katharine Drexel Regional Catholic School – Holland, Pennsylvania
- St. Katharine Drexel School – St. Cloud, Minnesota
- St. Katharine Drexel School – St. Louis. (2005 to 2011)
- St. Katharine Drexel School – Pittsburgh, Pennsylvania. (2008 to 2013
- St. Katharine Drexel School – Beaver Dam, Wisconsin

==== Streets ====
- Drexel Road, Tucson, Arizona
- Drexel Drive, New Orleans, Louisiana
- Drexel Street, Nashville, Tennessee
- Drexel Avenue, Oak Creek, Milwaukee County, Wisconsin (Drexel Towne Centre, Oak Creek, Milwaukee County, Wisconsin)

==== Other places ====
- Katharine Drexel Library, Free Library of Philadelphia – Philadelphia, Pennsylvania
- St. Katharine Drexel Region, Secular Franciscan Order – Eastern Pennsylvania
- St. Katharine Drexel Retirement Center – El Reno, Oklahoma

== Film biography ==
The Total Gift: A Katherine Drexel Story (2023) is a 23-minute documentary film on Drexel's life. It was produced by Joyful Films, with Bill Rose and Gus DeSimone as co-producers. Sarah Carpenter portrayed the role of Drexel. The first screening of the film was held at the Cathedral Basilica of Saints Peter and Paul in Philadelphia.

== See also ==
- Saint Katharine Drexel, patron saint archive
- Sisters of the Blessed Sacrament
- Xavier University of Louisiana
