= Henry Gantt (colonel) =

- Born: 1831
- Died: 4 October, 1884 (aged 52–53)
- Allegiance: Confederate States of America
- Branch: Confederate States Army
- Commands: 19th Virginia Infantry Regiment
- Conflicts: American Civil War

Henry Gantt (1831 – October 4, 1884) was a Confederate States Army officer during the American Civil War.

Henry Gantt, son of Dr. John W. Gantt and Sarah Blakey Gantt (née Perkins), was born in Virginia in 1831. He attended the Virginia Military Institute from 1848 to 1851; graduating as 23rd out of 29. Farming and managing one of his family possessions, 508 acres of land named Valmont, he inherited that land when his father died in 1860. In the wake of John Brown's raid in 1859 Henry Gantt joined the Virginia Militia, by 1861 being captain and commanding officer of the Scottsville Guard.

When the American Civil War broke out the Scottsville Guard become Company C of the 19th Virginia Infantry Regiment and Gantt was named Major of the regiment. He was promoted to Lieutenant Colonel on April 29, 1862, and was wounded in the Second Battle of Manassas. On September 14 he was promoted to colonel and gained command of the 19th Virginia. He led his unit into the Battle of Gettysburg. On July 3, 1863 they participated in the Pickett-Pettigrew-Trimble Charge and Gantt was shot in the face, losing his teeth. Colonel Gantt was transported back to Virginia, being on leave until returning to the field in 1864. Gantt commanded the 19th Virginia during the Battle of North Anna. After being hospitalized again he briefly commanded the brigade during the Bermuda Hundred Campaign and at Petersburg but apparently was hospitalized again in March 1865. He was paroled on June 1, 1865.

Gantt returned to his estate and married Martha Burke Eppes shortly after the war; the pair would eventually have 3 daughters. Amassing debts and in bad health, Henry Grant died on October 4, 1884.
