= Belmead (Powhatan, Virginia) =

Historic house in Virginia, United States

- U.S. National Register of Historic Places
- Virginia Landmarks Register
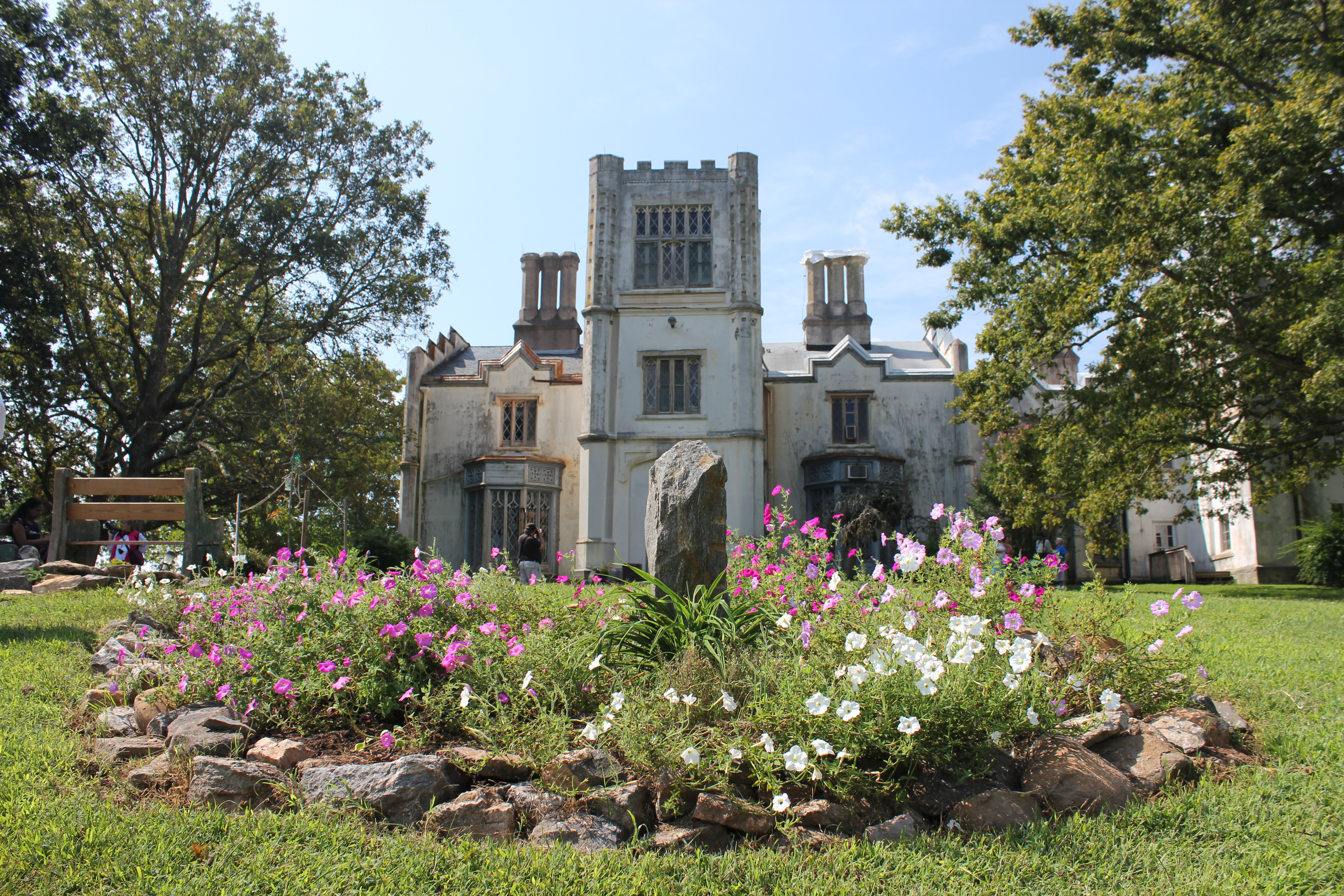
- Belmead, September 2012

- Location within Virginia Location within the United States
- Location: NW of jct. of Rtes. 663 and 600, near Powhatan, Virginia
- Coordinates: 37°37′24″N 77°58′45″W
- Area: 0 acres (0 ha)
- Built: c. 1845
- Architect: Davis, Alexander J.
- Architectural style: Gothic, Gothic Villa
- NRHP reference No.: 69000270 (original); 100011700 (increase)
- VLR No.: 072-0049

Significant dates
- Added to NRHP: November 12, 1969
- Boundary increase: April 14, 2025
- Designated VLR: May 13, 1969

Belmead (also known as Belmead Plantation, or Belmead-on-the-James) is a historic plantation located near Powhatan, Powhatan County, Virginia, designed by architect Alexander Jackson Davis for Philip St. George Cocke — and constructed about 1845.

It later became the site of two Black Catholic schools, St. Emma Military Academy and St. Francis de Sales, including the only military academy for African-American males.

== History ==
=== Slavery era and Philip Cocke ===
Belmead was built by Philip St. George Cocke in 1835. Cocke was the son of John Hartwell Cocke of Bremo Bluff in Fluvanna County, Virginia. He was a graduate of both the University of Virginia and the United States Military Academy and had served for a year in the US Army as a second lieutenant. He resigned in 1834 and consequently devoted his time to working many large plantations in Virginia and Mississippi. One of these plantations was Belmead.

Philip St. George Cocke married Sarah Elizabeth Courtney Bowdoin and had eleven children, the last nine of which were born on Belmead. During Cocke's tenure at Belmead, he owned a number of slaves who were forced to work on the plantation. According to US Federal Census Records, 82 slaves worked on Belmead in 1840. That number increased to 118 in 1850, 127 in 1854, and 124 in 1860. These slaves had an assortment of tasks on the tobacco and grain plantation.

In 1861, Cocke was appointed a brigadier general by the Virginia governor. He fought at the First Battle of Bull Run but later that year returned to Belmead.

=== Black Catholic schools ===
In 1897, the property was conveyed to the Sisters of the Blessed Sacrament, headed by Saint Katharine Drexel, and opened as St. Francis de Sales School, an all-Black school for girls, in 1899. St. Emma Military Academy for boys, named after Katharine's stepmother, was opened on the property by Edward Morrell and his wife Louise (Katharine's half-sister).

It was added to the National Register of Historic Places in 1969. The schools were closed in the early 1970s.

=== Sale and preservation ===
In 2016, the SBS sisters put the 2,265 acres on the market. The sale of the property was managed by Plante Moran Real Estate Investment Advisors, which asked for proposals by Dec. 19, 2016. The community and alumni formed a nonprofit, Belmead on the James, to mount a fundraising campaign.

In June 2019, the property was sold to Jeff Oakley for $6 million. He later allowed alumni to begin hosting tours and making the history of the property better-known.

== Architecture ==
The house is a two-story, Gothic Revival style stuccoed brick residence with a three-story central cross gable. It features a square tower with corner piers, crenellation, belt courses, ground level Tudor arched openings, and diamond-paned casement windows. The roofline has clusters of circular and polygonal shaped chimney stacks and stepped gable ends. The kitchen outbuilding was incorporated into an extensive two- and three-story addition built by the school.
