= Battle of Rio Hill =

Battle of the American Civil War

Coordinates: 38.0865°N 78.4726°W

- Part of the American Civil War
Date	February 29, 1864
Location	Albemarle County, Virginia
Result	Confederate victory

Belligerents
United States	Confederate States

Commanders and leaders
(United States) George A. Custer	(Confederate States of America) Marcellus N. Moorman

Strength
1,500 cavalrymen, 2 cannons	200 artillerymen, 16 cannons

Casualties and losses
1 man slightly wounded	2 men captured, substantial destruction or capture of equipment and partial destruction of camp

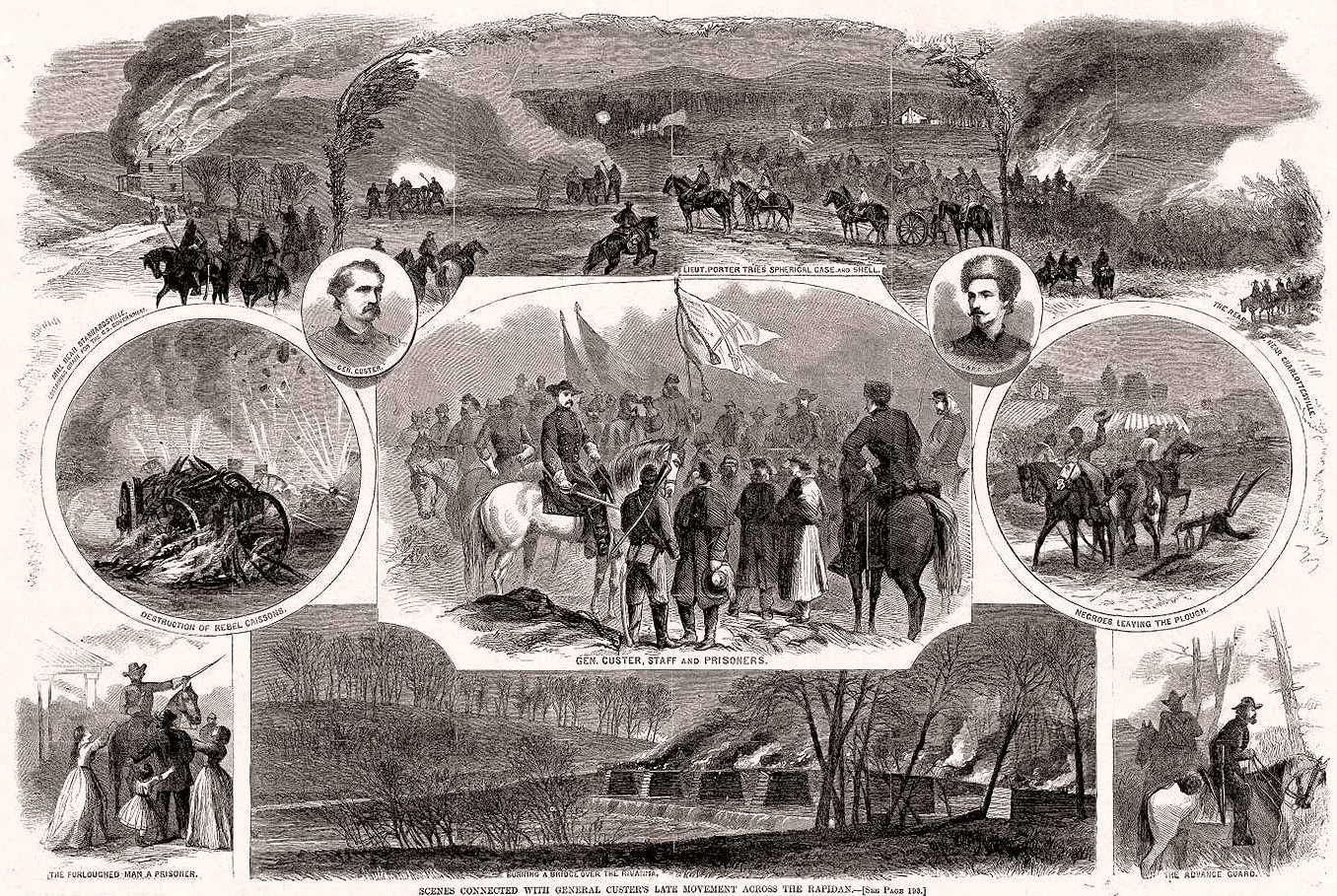
Scenes connected with General Custer's late movement across the Rapidan, Harper's Weekly, 1864

The Battle of Rio Hill was a skirmish in the American Civil War in which Union cavalry raided a Confederate camp in Albemarle County, Virginia.

In the early afternoon of February 28, 1864, Union Brig. Gen. George A. Custer and 1,500 Union soldiers advanced towards Charlottesville. This raid was an attempt by the Union to divert attention toward Charlottesville while a separate attempt was made to free prisoners of war being held in Richmond.

Custer's orders were to destroy a railroad bridge across the Rivanna River. His only opposition came from Confederate Maj. Gen. J.E.B. Stuart's "Horse Company" stationed in a camp near the Rivanna River at Carrsbrook. Custer's men raided the camp under fire from Confederate forces commanded by Capt. R. Preston Chew and Captain Marcellus N. Moorman. The Federal troopers looted the camp and set fire to it, after capturing two Confederate soldiers. During the raid, one of the Confederate caissons exploded, and Custer became confused believing that the explosion was actually the reopening of enemy artillery fire. His men fired into each other and then fled from the camp. The Confederate troops regrouped and chased Custer out of Albemarle.

Custer and Philip Sheridan returned to Charlottesville in 1865 and occupied the town from March 3 to March 7, a month before the Army of Northern Virginia surrendered at Appomattox.

== Background ==
After the Mine Run Campaign, Robert E. Lee's Confederate Army of Northern Virginia set up winter quarters in Orange County. Four batteries of Major General J.E.B. Stuart's horse artillery battalion encamped in nearby Albemarle County. The artillerymen began constructing winter huts just west of the Earlysville Road about 4 miles (6.4 km) north of Charlottesville, just south of the South Fork of the Rivanna River and Rio Mills. After the harsh campaigning of 1863, the Confederate gunners rested easily in their camp through the early weeks of 1864.

Northern forces, however, were busily at work. In early 1864, Union commanders devised a multi-objective raid on the Confederate capital of Richmond. While Judson Kilpatrick led the raid on Richmond (which included the infamous Dahlgren Affair), Brigadier General George A. Custer was tasked with leading a diversionary raid into Albemarle County. Charlottesville had long been a Union target. Custer's mission was twofold: Destroy Confederate supplies stockpiled in Charlottesville and destroy the Virginia Central Railroad bridge just east of town over the Rivanna River (the Railroad had longed served as a pipeline of supplies from the Shenandoah Valley to Lee's army). Custer was detached several regiments from different divisions and set out with his hodgepodge force from Mount Pony at 2:00 PM on February 28.

== Opposing forces ==
=== Union ===
Custer's force of about 1,500 men contained cavalry regiments from at least two divisions of the Army of the Potomac's Cavalry Corps, and a section of Parrott rifles from Battery E, 1st U.S. Artillery under First Lieutenant David Essex Porter to provide artillery support.

=== Confederate ===
The only cohesive Confederate forces in the immediate area of Custer's targets were the four batteries of Stuart's horse artillery encamped on Rio Hill, directly in Custer's intended path. The four batteries, of four guns each, were commanded by Captain Marcellus Newton Moorman, Captain Roger Preston Chew, Captain James Breathed, and Captain William Morrell McGregory. Moorman, as senior officer, served as acting commander for the entire battalion. The 16 cannons were manned by approximately 200 Confederate artillerymen.

== Preparations for battle ==
After departing from Mount Pony at 2:00 PM on February 28, Custer's men arrived at Madison Court House at about 6:00 PM that evening. Custer rested his men for the evening; at 2:00 AM the next morning, Custer's men continued towards Stanardsville. Not long after departing, Custer's men drove off Confederate pickets along the road. Upon arriving at Stanardsville, Custer's men drove off a score of mounted Confederate vedettes in the direction of Orange Court House. Custer's men continued to Earlysville; along the way, they learned from captured Confederate soldiers and sympathizers that Fitzhugh Lee's cavalry division was encamped near Charlottesville (a fabrication and exaggeration of the Confederates' real strength).

Moorman and his men were entirely unaware of the approaching Union column until about 12:30 PM, when a lieutenant in the 1st Virginia Cavalry reported that enemy cavalry had been detected 2 miles (3.2 km) south of Stanardsville and were moving towards Moorman's encampment. Moorman dispatched pickets to guard the bridge across the Rivanna at Rio Mills, but the pickets discovered the fast-moving Federal column had already seized the crossing point. There is some speculation that Moorman initially did not believe the report of approaching Federal cavalry; he received the warning at 12:30 PM, yet his pickets insisted that Rio Mills Bridge was occupied by Union forces when they arrived. Since Custer's men did not reach the bridge until 3:00 PM and Moorman's pickets had only 1.5 miles (2.4 km) to travel from their camp to the bridge, it seems probable that Moorman was initially reluctant to accept the warning or lethargic in carrying out preparations.

== Battle ==
One of Custer's officers recalled that just as the Union cavalry began crossing the bridge over the Rivanna at Rio Mills, four trains were heard moving into Charlottesville. It was assumed that this signified Confederate reinforcements arriving in Charlottesville. Moving quickly, Custer dispatched Captain Joseph P. Ash with sixty men of the 5th U.S. Cavalry to cross about a mile downstream at Cook's Ford to attack the Confederate camp from the east and south while Custer's main force attacked from the north and west.

Even with the warning given almost two and half hours before Custer's men crossed the bridge, Moorman's men were apparently still largely unprepared to defend their camp. To buy time, Moorman ordered several pieces from each battery to engage Custer's main force advancing down the Earlysville Road while the rest of his cannon limbered up and withdrew to safety. After the first half of his cannon were limbered up and withdrawn from immediate danger, the rest of the cannons were hitched up and pulled out of the camp as Custer's main body reached the camp's northern outskirts. At the same time, Captain Ash's squadrons, having completed their crossing at Cook's Ford, rode towards the Confederate camp from the east. Desperate for more time, Moorman ordered four cannons deployed into battery on a ridge just south of the camp; as the four guns fired ordnance into their own camp, now swarming with Federal cavalry, a skirmish line was deployed to support the battery. The thin line, armed only with pistols, were tasked with guarding the guns until Moorman could gather forces against Custer's horsemen.

Moorman, recognizing the grave nature of the situation, ordered his artillerymen to mount their battery horses and form into line. Splitting the pseudo-cavalrymen into two groups (one under Captain Chew, the other under Captain Breathed), Moorman ordered his men to simulate cavalry reinforcements arriving on the field. Armed with pistols and sticks picked up off the ground, the mounted artillerymen rode about the four guns still firing into the reforming Federals in the camp.

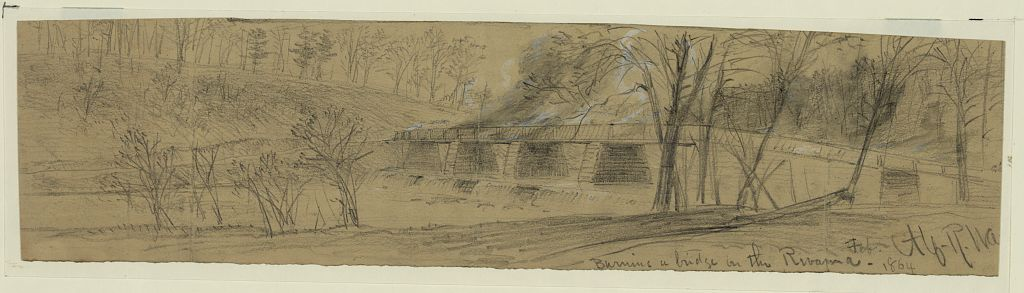
"Burning a bridge on the Rivanna, Feb. 1864" by Alfred R. Waud. Waud, a well-known newspaper artist, accompanied Custer's expedition. He sketched this drawing of the burning of the bridge over the Rivanna River at Rio Mills by Custer's men.

Incredibly, the ruse worked. Custer's men stalled at the sight of what was apparently a substantial cavalry reinforcement for the enemy. As they moved forward through the camp, Custer's main force ran head-on into Captain Ash's detachment, which at that moment was riding into the Confederate camp from the east; surprised and disoriented, the two groups of Union soldiers began firing into one another. Just then, a Confederate caisson, left behind in the Confederate camp, exploded. In the mounting chaos, Custer's men withdrew entirely from the camp. Seeing the line of Confederate horsemen arriving on the scene, Custer assumed he was now outnumbered and ordered a retreat across the Rivanna. As his forces withdrew in some confusion into Rio Mills, Federal soldiers burned the bridge over the river behind them to delay the expected Confederate counterattack. After burning the namesake mill in the small community, Custer's men withdrew back the way they had come towards Stanardsville. The whole skirmish, from the arrival of Federal forces at the Rivanna bridge to their burning of that structure, lasted barely an hour.

== Aftermath ==
At 9:00 PM, still 8 miles (13 km) south of Stanardsville, Custer's men bivouacked for about an hour and a half. 500 men mistakenly continued their retreat through the night, thus reducing Custer's force to 1,000 men. The next morning, March 1, Custer's men engaged Confederate forces in what became known as the Battle of Stanardsville. After that battle, Custer's men withdrew to their original pre-raid positions beyond Madison, arriving there by dusk that evening.

Custer reported of that, over the course of his expedition, his men "marched upwards of 150 miles (240 km), destroyed the bridge over the Rivanna River, burned 3 large flouting mills filled with grain and flour, captured 6 caissons and 2 forges, with harness complete; captured 1 standard bearing the arms of Virginia, over 50 prisoners, and about 500 horses, besides bringing away over 100 contrabands. A large camp of the enemy was also captured and destroyed near Charlottesville." Incredibly, Custer suffered only one casualty during the raid and skirmish at Rio Hill (one trooper slightly wounded).

Confederate Captain Moorman recorded his losses as such ": Moorman's battery, 2 men and 2 horses captured; Chew's battery, 10 sets harness, 1 limber with canteens, 1 forge, 6 tents, 5 tent-flies, 4 tarpaulins, 60 pounds axle grease, 15 curry-combs and brushes, 3 public horses, 40 Government bags; Breathed's battery, 9 tents, 2 horses, 3 1\2 sets harness; McGregor's battery, 6 sets harness, 3 tent-flies, 12 bridles, 6 saddles and blankets, 4 halters, 2 mules, 4 skillets, 2 camp-kettles, 4 water-buckets. In addition to the losses enumerated I would state that the battalion suffered heavily in private effects, especially Chew's and Breathed's batteries." The partial destruction of the Confederate camp was quickly repaired.

Thus, the only casualties of the battle were one Federal slightly wounded and two Confederates captured.

== Legacy ==
Though remembered with some sense of local pride as the only noteworthy Civil War engagement in Albemarle County, no effort was made to preserve the location of the camp and the surrounding battleground. Archaeological digs and research were conducted, but were limited, often carried out solely by curious locals with metal detectors. In 1988, a shopping center was built on the precise location of the Confederate camp; subsequent development covered virtually the entirety of the battlefield. In 1989, a Virginia Highway Marker, entitled "Skirmish at Rio Hill", was placed in the shopping center to commemorate the event. A display case several yards away, erected by the Albemarle Charlottesville Historical Society, containing additional information about the battle was erected with support by the shopping center when it was built. The display was updated in February 2014 on the 150th anniversary of the event by the Historical Society.

On March 1, 2014, the 150-year anniversary of the skirmish, reenactors from the 7th Virginia Infantry, Company F, and the 19th Virginia Infantry, Company B, set up a living history display in the shopping center parking lot; the commemoration included the unveiling of an updated display case.
