= Carrsbrook, Virginia =

Unincorporated community in Virginia, U.S.

Carrsbrook
- Unincorporated community
- Location within the state of Virginia Carrsbrook (the United States)
- Coordinates: 38°05′35″N 78°27′28″W
- Country: United States
- State: Virginia
- County: Albemarle
- Time zone: UTC−5 (Eastern (EST))
  - Summer (DST): UTC−4 (EDT)
- GNIS feature ID: 1492719

Carrsbrook is an unincorporated community in Albemarle County, Virginia, United States.

Confederate Maj. Gen. J.E.B. Stuart's "Horse Company" and Confederate infantrymen were stationed in a camp near the Rivanna River at Carrsbrook during the Civil War. Union Brig. Gen. George A. Custer's men raided the camp under fire from Confederate forces.

See Battle of Rio Hill.
