= Philip St. George Cocke =

Confederate Army general (1809–1861)

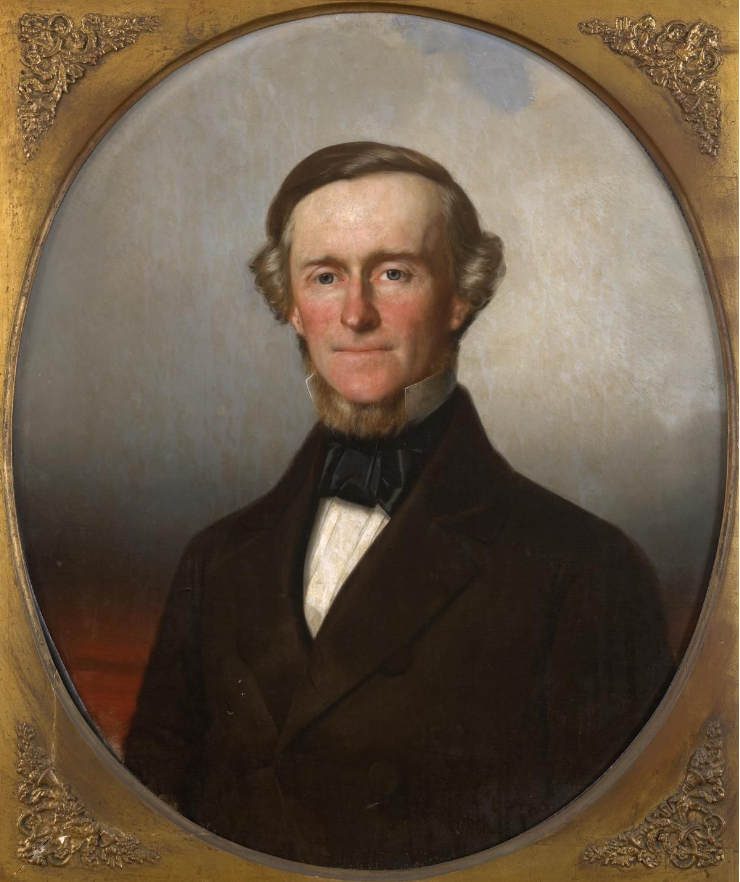
- Portrait of Philip St. George Cocke by Louis Mathieu Didier Guillaume
- Born: April 17, 1809; Bremo Bluff, Virginia, U.S.
- Died: December 26, 1861 (aged 52); Powhatan County, Virginia, C.S.
- Burial place: Hollywood Cemetery (Richmond, Virginia)
- Military career
- Allegiance: United States; Confederate States of America
- Branch: US Army; Confederate States Army
- Service years: 1832–1834 (USA); 1861 (CSA)
- Rank: Second Lieutenant (USA); Brigadier General (VA Volunteers); Brigadier General (CSA)
- Unit: 2nd U.S. Artillery
- Commands: 19th Virginia Infantry; 5th Brigade - Army of the Potomac
- Conflicts: American Civil War
- Other work: Board of Visitors of the Virginia Military Institute

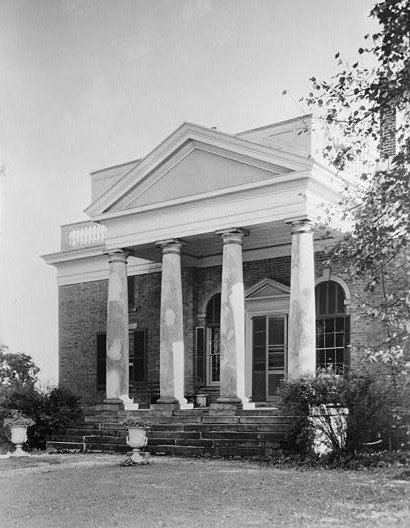
Bremo Plantation

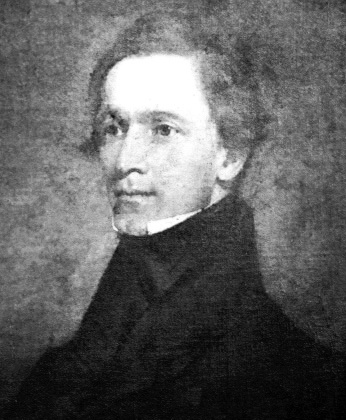
Philip St. George Cocke, 1850s

Philip St. George Cocke (April 17, 1809 – December 26, 1861) was a brigadier general in the Confederate States Army during the first year of the American Civil War. He is best known for organizing the defense of Virginia along the Potomac River soon after the state's secession from the Union. He commanded troops in the Battle of Blackburn's Ford and the First Battle of Bull Run (First Manassas) in July 1861 before becoming despondent and committing suicide.

== Early life and education ==
Philip St. George Cocke was born at Bremo Bluff in Fluvanna County, Virginia, in 1809 to John Hartwell Cocke (1780–1866) a local militia officer and who would become an officer in the United States Army during the War of 1812 and the former Anne Blaus Barraud. He had elder brothers John Hartwell Cocke Jr. (1804–1846) and James Hartwell Cocke (1797–1853) and younger brother Dr. Cary Charles Cocke (1814–1888), as well as several sisters.

Cocke graduated from the University of Virginia in 1828 and then from the United States Military Academy in 1832 with the rank of brevet second lieutenant. He was soon assigned as second lieutenant to an artillery unit in Charleston, South Carolina, during the nullification crisis of 1832–33. He became adjutant of the 2nd U.S. Artillery on July 13, 1833. On April 1, 1834, having completed the year of military service required of all USMA graduates at the time, Cocke resigned from the military and concentrated on operating various large plantations in Virginia and Mississippi as described below. He married Sallie Elizabeth Courtney Bowdoin on June 4, 1834. They would have many children as described below.

== Plantation owner ==
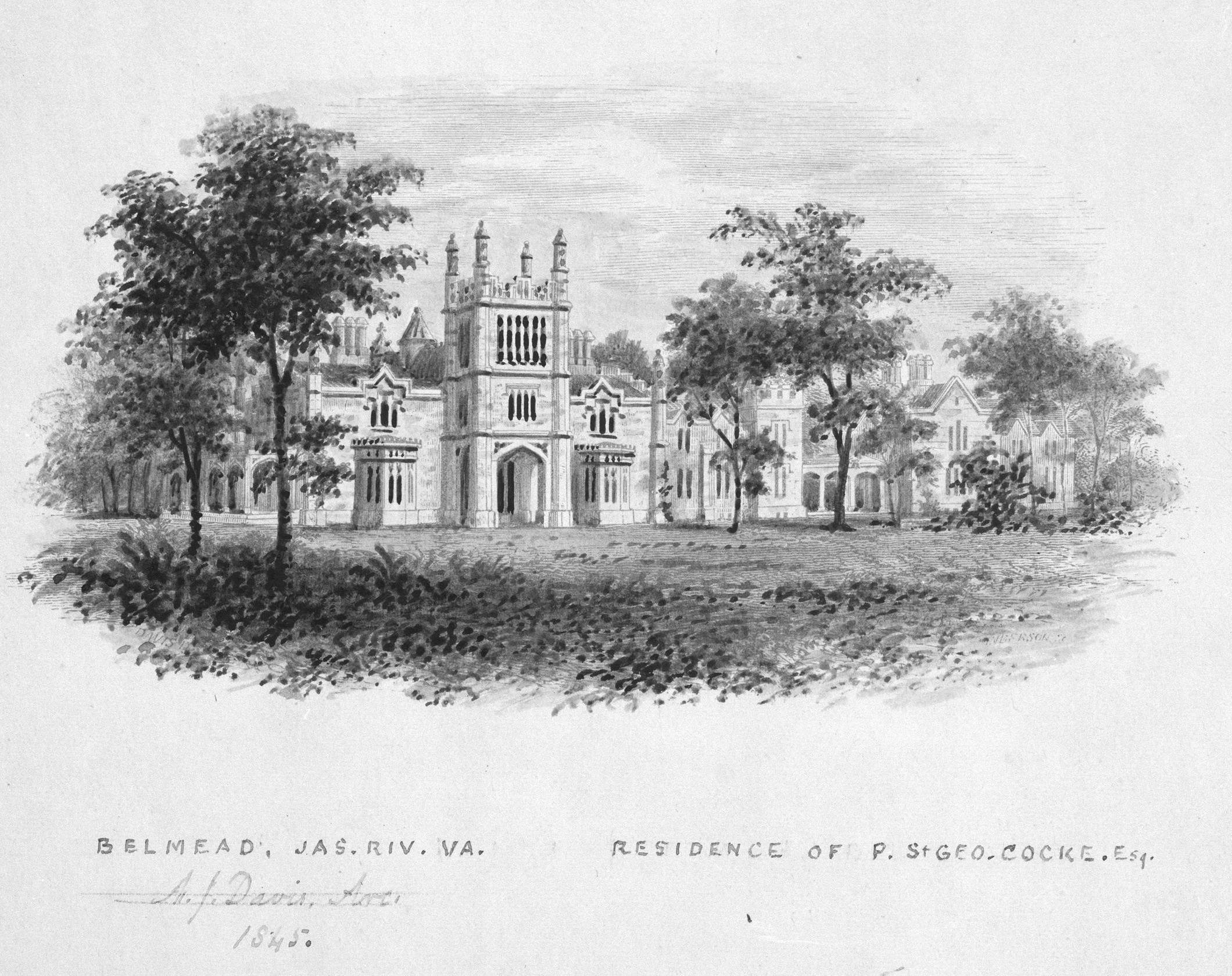
Belmead Plantation

Philip St. George Cocke owned large plantations in several Virginia counties, including Powhatan, Surry and Brunswick Counties, as well as cotton plantations in Mississippi. He used enslaved labor on all his plantations. In 1835, Philip St. George Cocke commissioned architect A.J. Davis to build a manor house named "Belmead" in Powhatan County. In 1840, Cocke owned 30 slaves in Surry County, 125 slaves in Brunswick County and 82 slaves in Powhatan County. The numbers grew by 1850 to 118 slaves in Powhatan County, 45 in the southern district of Brunswick County, and 187 slaves in Lowndes County, Mississippi. In 1860, Cocke owned 124 slaves in Powhatan County, at least 33 in Yazoo County, Mississippi, and possibly another 39 in Holmes County, Mississippi, and 52 in Fluvanna County, Virginia.

Cocke published many articles in journals, as well as a book on plantation management entitled Plantation and Farm Instruction in 1852. From 1853 to 1856, Cocke was president of the Virginia State Agricultural Society. In 1859, concerned by John Brown's Raid on Harpers Ferry, he organized a militia infantry company known as the Powhatan Troop to help defend Powhatan County in case of a similar action or a slave revolt in the future.

== Civil War service ==
=== Organization of Virginia's defenses ===
On April 21, 1861, Cocke was appointed as a brigadier general in the service of the Commonwealth of Virginia by Governor John Letcher. He was assigned command of all state forces along the Potomac River. Three days later, from his headquarters at Alexandria, Virginia, he reported to newly commissioned Maj. Gen. Robert E. Lee (assigned on April 22 to the command of all Virginia forces) that he had only 300 men to defend against what he thought was 10,000 Union troops across the river in Washington, D.C. Cocke made his headquarters at Culpeper, Virginia, on April 27, in order to better oversee the entire line of the Potomac as well as the mustering of volunteer troops in a large part of the state. Alexandria was evacuated by Lt. Col. A. S. Taylor on May 5, despite Cocke's orders "not to abandon it without fighting, even against overwhelming numbers."

Under Lee's orders, Cocke organized a new defensive line at Manassas. Cocke may have been the first to formulate the Confederate defensive strategy of concentrating forces at Manassas and at Winchester in the Shenandoah Valley, and using the Manassas Gap Railroad to allow them to be mutually supporting. This strategy would be a decisive factor in the Confederate victory in the First Battle of Bull Run.

When Virginia's state forces were consolidated with the Provisional Army of the Confederate States, Cocke was given the rank of colonel in the new CSA forces. Because of this effective demotion, Cocke was superseded in command at Manassas on May 21 by Brig. Gen. Milledge L. Bonham and took command of the 19th Virginia Infantry Regiment.

=== First Bull Run Campaign ===
Cocke was eventually assigned to the army of P. G. T. Beauregard in command of the 5th Brigade, consisting of the 8th, 18th, 19th, 28th, and 49th Virginia Infantry regiments. His brigade was initially assigned to Centreville, but in the face of advancing Union forces, withdrew behind Bull Run on July 17.

He was officially thanked by Beauregard for his ability shown in strategic movements at the Battle of Blackburn's Ford.

On July 20 Cocke was stationed at Ball's Ford on Bull Run. In the subsequent First Battle of Bull Run on July 21, 1861, Cocke was assigned to advance against Centreville, a plan abandoned when the Federals began their flanking movement against the Confederate left. While Col. Nathan George Evans, reinforced by Brig. Gen. Barnard Bee and Col. Francis S. Bartow, opposed the enemy, Cocke's forces defended against attack in the vicinity of the Stone Bridge, with his headquarters at the Lewis house. At 2 p.m., about an hour before the arrival of Elzey, he led his brigade into action on the left with "alacrity and effect." He was promoted to brigadier general in the Confederate Army on October 21 and given command of the 3rd Brigade, 3rd Division of the Confederate Army of the Potomac.

== Death and legacy ==
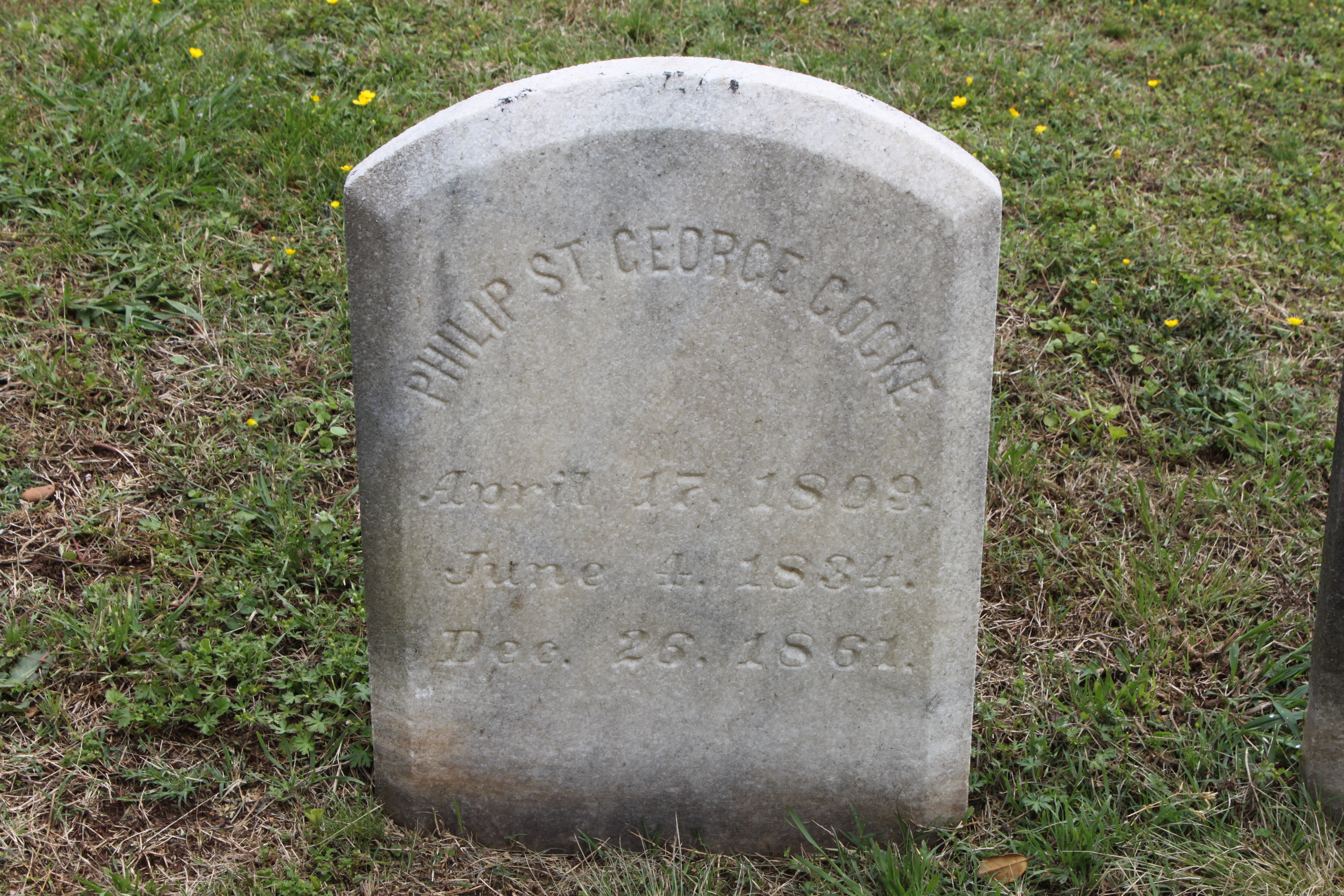
Grave of Cocke at Hollywood Cemetery in Richmond

First Bull Run proved to be Cocke's last major battle. After eight months' service, during which he was promoted to brigadier general in the provisional Confederate army, he returned home, "shattered in body and mind." Exhausted from the strain, and despondent over perceived slights from General Beauregard stemming from the Battle of Manassas, Cocke shot himself in the head on December 26, 1861, at his "Belmead" mansion in Powhatan County, Virginia. He was initially buried on the plantation grounds, but was re-interred in 1904 at Hollywood Cemetery, Richmond, Virginia, where he rests with several other family members and Confederate officers.

His plantation "Belmead" was put up for sale years after the war ended, but remains today, although further preservation needs have caused controversy.

== Family ==
Philip St. George Cocke was the son of John Hartwell Cocke (b. September 19, 1780, in Surry County, Virginia) and Anne Blaws Barraud (b. December 25, 1784, in Norfolk, Virginia.)

He married Sallie Elizabeth Courtney Bowdoin (b. May 9, 1815) at Christ Church in Norfolk, Virginia, on June 4, 1834. The couple had 11 children:

1. John Bowdoin Cocke, b. October 2, 1836, Richmond, Virginia
2. Louisiana Barraud Cocke, b. November 14, 1837, Surry Co., VA
3. Sally Browne Cocke, b. January 31, 1840, Powhatan Co., VA
4. Lucy Cary Cocke, b. June 25, 1842
5. Philip St. George Cocke, b. March 17, 1844, Powhatan Co., VA
6. William Ruffin Coleman Cocke, b. August 7, 1846, Powhatan Co., VA
7. Courtney Bowdoin Cocke, b. September 27, 1848
8. Charles Hartwell Cocke, b. March 12, 1851, Powhatan Co., VA
9. Mary Augusta Cocke, b. June 19, 1852
10. Helen Hansford Cocke, b. January 28, 1855
11. Ann Blaws Cocke, b. March 19, 1857

== See also ==
- List of American Civil War generals (Confederate)
