= Army of the Potomac (Confederate) =

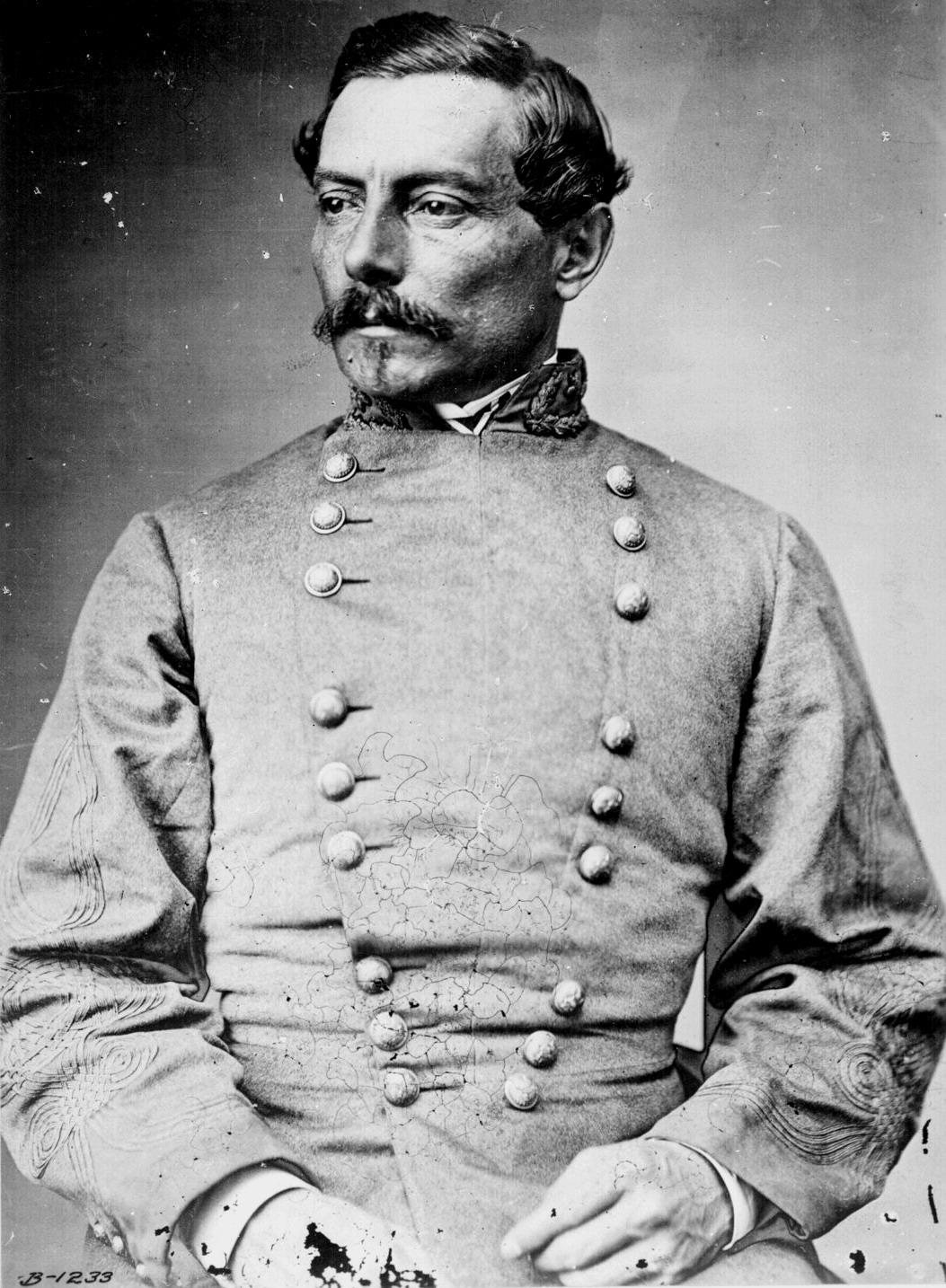
- P. G. T. Beauregard
- Active: April 1861 – March 14, 1862
- Country: Confederate States of America
- Branch: Confederate States Army
- Role: Confederate army in Eastern Theater
- Engagements: American Civil War: Manassas Campaign; First Battle of Bull Run; Battle of Ball's Bluff

Commanders
- Notable commanders: P.G.T. Beauregard; Joseph E. Johnston

The Confederate Army of the Potomac, whose name was short-lived, was under the command of Brig. Gen. P. G. T. Beauregard in the early days of the American Civil War. Its only major combat action was the First Battle of Bull Run. Afterwards, the Army of the Shenandoah was merged into the Army of the Potomac with Gen. Joseph E. Johnston, the commander of the Shenandoah, taking command. The Army of the Potomac was renamed the Army of Northern Virginia on March 14, 1862, with Beauregard's original army eventually becoming the First Corps, Army of Northern Virginia.

== History ==
The army was formed from Confederate units defending northeastern Virginia, which arrived over the course of April to July 1861. Philip St. George Cocke was appointed to command the area of Virginia along "the line of the Potomac" and to muster the local militia companies into Confederate service. Regiments from Alabama, Georgia, Louisiana, Mississippi, and South Carolina also arrived in Virginia and were assigned to Cocke's command. On May 21, Cocke was replaced in command in northeastern Virginia by Milledge L. Bonham, who was in turn superseded by P. G. T. Beauregard ten days later. Beauregard divided his army into six brigades (two of which were commanded by Cocke and Bonham) and concentrated them along the south bank of Bull Run, intending to defend the rail center of Manassas Junction. He would be reinforced by additional regiments over the next few weeks, forming a seventh brigade, and received the brigade of Theophilus H. Holmes as well.

Over the course of his first weeks in command, Beauregard sent to Confederate president Jefferson Davis various plans for an offensive against Union forces in northern Virginia, which usually involved coordination with Joseph E. Johnston's Army of the Shenandoah. Both Davis and his military advisor, Robert E. Lee, rejected these plans as being impractical. On July 18, as forces from the Union Army of Northeastern Virginia commanded by Irvin McDowell advanced to within a few miles of Beauregard's positions, the Confederate War Department ordered Johnston to transfer his army to reinforce Beauregard; his army arrived by rail over the next few days. Johnston was the senior officer present and had overall command of the combined Confederate armies. Beauregard had drawn up plans for an attack on the Union left wing across Bull Run and convinced Johnston to approve the plan. Johnston deferred the issuing of orders to Beauregard since he was more familiar with the terrain.

During the First Battle of Bull Run, which occurred on July 21, Colonel Nathan Evans' brigade from the Army of the Potomac began the opening stages of the fighting on Matthews Hill, reinforced by two brigades from Johnston's army. As the fighting shifted to Henry House Hill, Cocke's and Jubal Early's brigades along with units from Bonham's brigade from Beauregard's army, along with the rest of Johnston's army, were shifted to the Confederate left wing. An attack by Early's brigade on the Union right flank at about 4 p.m. helped drive the Union army from the field. Beauregard's brigades lost fewer men than Johnston's brigades, but some commands still suffered a casualty rate as high as twenty percent.

Most of Beauregard's brigades remained on the Confederate right, since Beauregard still hoped to launch an attack on the Union left wing. However, because of contradictory and confusing orders, some of which apparently were never delivered to the intended recipients, the attack was never launched. The brigades on this part of the field never fought at all or participated in only minor skirmishing. David R. Jones and James Longstreet crossed Bull Run and attempted to organize an attack but following a brief skirmish Jones' brigade was thrown back due to heavy artillery fire. Both brigades subsequently withdrew back to Bull Run.

The two Confederate armies were consolidated into a single army following the battle, retaining the name "Army of the Potomac" and with Johnston in command; Beauregard was initially posted as its second-in-command but he was soon transferred to the Western Theater. The army was spread through northern Virginia to observe the Union Army of the Potomac in Washington, fighting several small skirmishes including the Battle of Ball's Bluff. In the spring of 1862, Johnston's army was transferred to the Richmond area, where the Army of the Peninsula and the Confederate garrison of Norfolk, Virginia, were incorporated into the army. At this time in the Peninsula Campaign, the army was officially renamed the Army of Northern Virginia, although Johnston continued to use the name Army of the Potomac until he was wounded.

== See also ==
- Army of the Potomac (a Union army)
- First Bull Run Confederate order of battle
