= Oyen (disambiguation) =

Oyen or Øyen may refer to:

== People ==
- Arild Retvedt Øyen (born 1946), Norwegian veterinarian and diplomat
- Else Øyen, Norwegian sociologist
- Knud Iversen Øyen (1865–1942), Norwegian jurist and politician
- Kristen Øyen (born 1938), Norwegian forester
- Jarmund Øyen (born 1944), Norwegian politician
- Odd Øyen (1914–1997), Norwegian WW2 resistance member
- Ørjar Øyen (born 1927), Norwegian sociologist
- Sofie Oyen (born 1992), Belgian tennis player
- Tera de Marez Oyens (1932–1996), Dutch composer

== Places ==
- Oyen, town in Alberta, Canada
- Saint-Oyen (disambiguation)
  - Saint-Oyen, Savoie, in France
  - Saint-Oyen, Aosta Valley, in Italy
  - Saint-Oyens, in Switzerland

== Animals ==
- Oyen, Cat in Malay Language etymology verb, usually referring to the ginger cat
