= Mosby =

Mosby may refer to:

== Places ==
=== Antarctica ===
- Mosby Glacier

=== Norway ===
- Mosby, Norway, village and district in Kristiansand municipality in Vest-Agder county
- Mosby Peak, Bouvet Island

=== United States ===
- Mosby, Missouri, city in Clay County, Missouri
- Mosby, Montana, unincorporated community in southwestern Garfield County, Montana
- Mosby Tavern, 1740 historical building in Powhatan County, Virginia, also known as "Littleberry Mosby House" or "Old Cumberland Courthouse"
- Mosby Court, neighborhood and housing project in Richmond, Virginia
- Mosby Creek (disambiguation), multiple places
- Mosby Hill, Oregon

== Other ==
- Mosby (publisher), American medical publishing firm absorbed by Elsevier; its name survives as an Elsevier imprint name
- Mosby (name)

== See also ==
- Moseby, a surname
