= Graue =

Graue is a surname. Notable people with the surname include:

- Arnfinn Graue (1926–2021), Norwegian nuclear physicist
- Enrique Graue Wiechers (born 1951), Mexican ophthalmologist and academic
- M. Elizabeth Graue, American academic

== See also ==
- Graue Mill, a grist mill in Oak Brook, Illinois, United States
