= Human Rights as Human Independence =

2022 non-fiction book by Julio Montero

Human Rights as Human Independence: A Philosophical and Legal Interpretation
- Author: Julio Montero
- Publisher: University of Pennsylvania Press
- Publication date: 2022
- Pages: 273

Human Rights as Human Independence: A Philosophical and Legal Interpretation is a non-fiction book by Julio Montero. it was published in 2022 by the University of Pennsylvania Press as part of their Pennsylvania Studies in Human Rights series.

== General references ==
- Banai, Hussein (March 2023). "Human Rights as Human Independence: A Philosophical and Legal Interpretation. By Julio Montero. Philadelphia: University of Pennsylvania Press, 2022. 200p. $45.00 cloth". Perspectives on Politics. 21 (1): 360–362. doi:10.1017/S1537592722003346. ISSN 1537-5927.
- Holzer, Felicitas Sofia (2024-11-05). "Julio Montero: Human Rights as Human Independence: A Philosophical and Legal Interpretation: Philadelphia: 2022, University of Pennsylvania Press. Hardback (ISBN 0812253949), USD, 272 Pages". Ethical Theory and Moral Practice. doi:10.1007/s10677-024-10473-w. ISSN 1386-2820.
