= Seth Lazar =

British philosopher

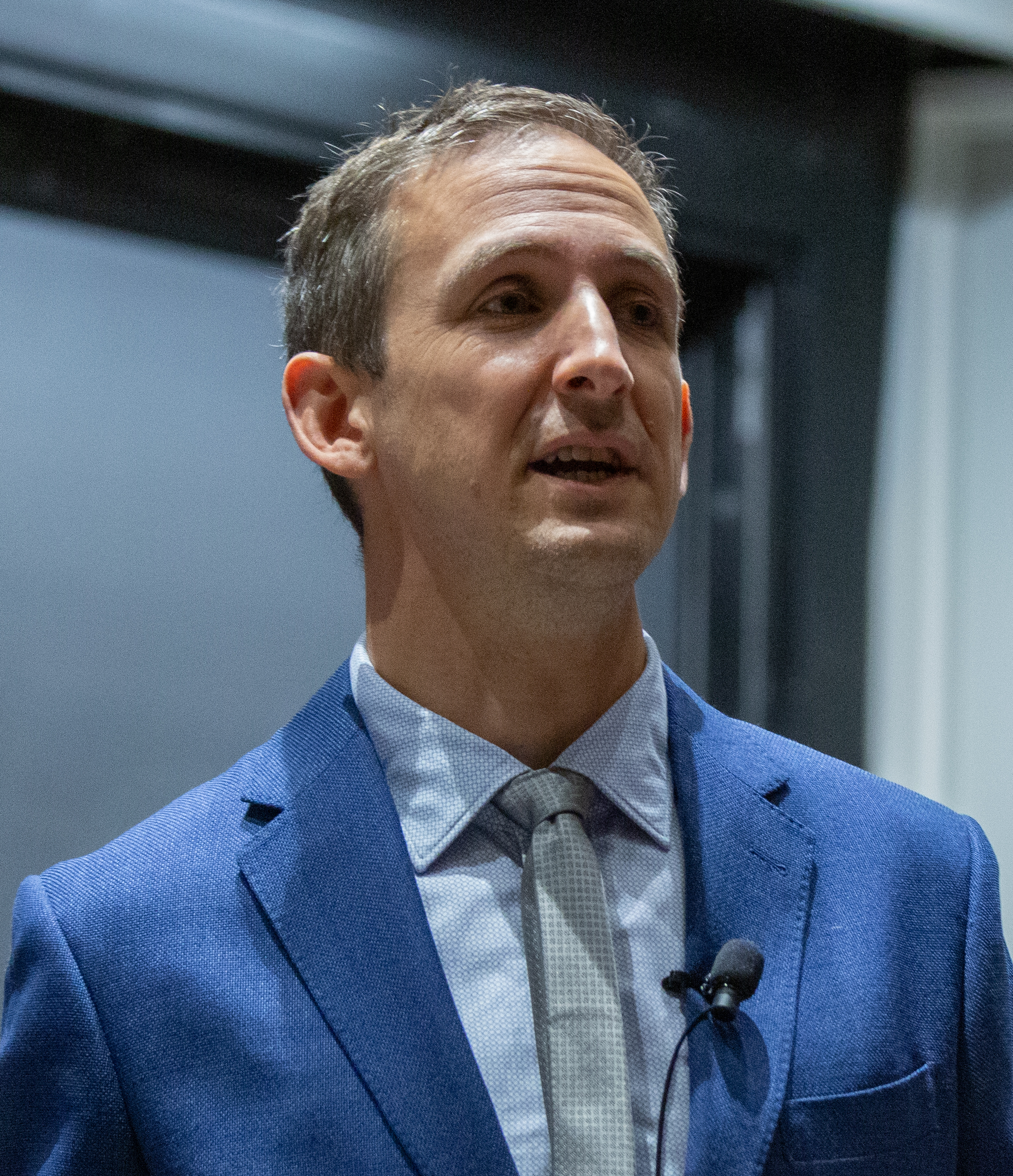
- Seth Lazar at the Edmond J. Safra Center for Ethics in 2022.
- Born: 1979 (age 46–47)
- Awards: Frank Chapman Sharp Prize, DECRA grant, Early Career Award (ASSA), Res Publica Postgraduate Essay Prize

Education
- Education: Oxford University
- Thesis: War and associative duties (2009)
- Doctoral advisor: Henry Shue

Philosophical work
- Era: 21st-century philosophy
- Region: Western philosophy
- School: Analytic
- Institutions: Johns Hopkins University; Australian National University
- Main interests: political philosophy, moral philosophy
- Website: https://sethlazar.org/

Seth Lazar (born 1979) is a British philosopher and Professor at Johns Hopkins University School of Government and Policy. He leads the Machine Intelligence and Normative Theory Lab.

Lazar won the Frank Chapman Sharp Prize in 2011 "for the best unpublished monograph on the philosophy of war and peace". He is known for his research on defensive war.

Lazar's recent work has focused on "the morality, law, and politics of AI", with a particular focus on "the political philosophy of data and AI." In 2021, Lazar was awarded an Australian Research Council Future Fellowship for the proposal "Automatic Authorities: Charting a Course for Legitimate AI.".

He gave the 2023 Tanner Lecture on AI and Human Values at Stanford University.

== Books ==
- Sparing Civilians, Oxford University Press, 2015
- The Morality of Defensive War, (Co-Editor, with Fabre, C), Oxford University Press, 2014
- Oxford Handbook of Ethics of War, (Co-Editor, with Helen Frowe), Oxford University Press, 2018
