= Henry Shue =

American philosopher (born 1940)

- Born: March 24, 1940 (age 86)

Philosophical work
- Era: 21st-century philosophy
- Region: Western philosophy
- School: Analytic
- Institutions: Merton College
- Doctoral students: Seth Lazar Janina Dill
- Main interests: political philosophy, moral philosophy

Henry Greyson Shue (born March 24, 1940) is an American philosopher and Professor Emeritus of Politics and International Relations at Merton College of Oxford University. Previously he was Wyn and William Y Hutchinson Professor of Ethics & Public Life at Cornell University. Shue is best known for his book, Basic Rights: Subsistence, Affluence, and U.S. Foreign Policy. Henry Shue was awarded the ASAP Lifetime Achievement Award by Academics Stand Against Poverty.

== Books ==
- Basic Rights (Princeton 1980; 2nd edition, 1996) ISBN 9780691029290
- Climate Justice: Vulnerability and Protection
- Fighting Hurt: Rule and Exception in Torture and War
- The Pivotal Generation: Why We Have a Moral Responsibility to Slow Climate Change Right Now. Princeton University Press, 2021. (ISBN 9780691220062)

=== Edited books ===
- Preemption: Military Action and Moral Justification, co-edited with David Rodin, Oxford University Press, 2010, ISBN 9780199565993
- Nuclear Deterrence and Moral Restraint: Critical Choices for American Strategy (Cambridge Studies in Philosophy and Public Policy)
- Climate Ethics: Essential Readings
- The American Way of Bombing: Changing Ethical and Legal Norms, from Flying Fortresses to Drones
- Just and Unjust Warriors: The Moral and Legal Status of Soldiers
- Climate Justice: Integrating Economics and Philosophy (co-edited with Ravi Kanbur). Oxford University Press, 2019.
- The Border That Joins: Mexican Migrants & U. S. Responsibility (Maryland Studies in Public Philosophy)

== See also ==
- Preventive war
- Preemptive war
- distributive justice
- international normative theory
