= Academics Stand Against Poverty =

- Founded: 2011
- Type: Nonprofit, NGO
- Purpose: Research, Policy, Advocacy, Poverty Eradication
- Location: New Haven, Connecticut, United States
- Region served: Worldwide
- Services: Charitable services
- Website: academicsstand.org

Academics Stand Against Poverty (ASAP) is an international network of scholars, teachers, and students working to mobilize the resources of academia to help alleviate poverty.

== Projects ==
ASAP is currently engaged in a range of efforts aimed at leveraging the resources of academia toward poverty alleviation around the world. Its network has been described as a group that “lies between academia and activism. Like the latter, it aims primarily at persuading and motivating people to change their behavior. Like the former, it does so by moral and political argument, using the distinctive skills of academics.” ASAP's mission is to help scholars, teachers, and students enhance their impact on poverty. It does so by promoting collaboration among poverty-focused academics, by helping them share research on poverty with public audiences, policy makers, and NGOs, and by helping academics use their expertise to achieve an impact on global poverty through intervention projects. ASAP's strategic plan outlines the priorities of the global organization. ASAP's first global flagship project is Global Colleagues, a program that offers one-to-one matches of poverty researchers worldwide and in which all ASAP chapters are participating.

== History ==
ASAP was founded by a group of nine academics in six countries with the mission of helping academics make a greater impact on global poverty. Those nine academics comprised ASAP's original board of directors. The board developed the ASAP network by holding national launch conferences in the United States at Yale University, in the United Kingdom at the University of Birmingham, in Norway at the University of Oslo, and in India at the University of Delhi in 2011. In 2012, ASAP-Canada held a national launch conference in Toronto, Canada at Ryerson University (now Toronto Metropolitan University).

== Structure ==
The board includes leading academics from a variety of fields, all with a passionate interest in poverty alleviation. The current Management Board is composed of Thomas Pogge (President), Helen Yanacopulos (Fundraising Director), Catarina Tully (Co-Chapter Lead), Mihaita Lupu (Co-chapter Lead), Daniele Botti (Treasurer), Michal Apollo (Communications Lead) and Zeke Ngcobo. Soe Thaw Tar Kyaw Min has served as Global Coordinator since 2025.

== Global Colleagues Program ==
ASAP has select global flagship programs that are sustained across national and regional chapters. One of ASAP's core flagship programs, Global Colleagues, brings together researchers at an early stage in their career and provides them opportunities for strong research networks, research resources, networking and grant/funding possibilities, and mentorship opportunities with more experienced researchers that are able to offer support to their colleagues in these areas.

Global Colleagues partnerships aim to foster collaborations between earlier career scholars based in the Global South with more experienced scholars in the Global South and North. The program seeks to address poverty's more pressing issues in a globalized world. The partnerships are two-way collaborations where scholars in the earlier stages of their career and those more experienced researchers are enabled to learn from each other.

The one-on-one partnership takes place over the course of one year and involves both parties engaging in regular contact and continual progress assessments on the achievement of pre-agreed upon mutual goals. Usually partners within the program are matched with researchers with mutual interests and across international regions as well. During the duration of the partnership, the Global Colleagues team provides support to the matched colleagues to support their goals and outcomes.

Global Colleagues is run by a team of international volunteers (lead project manager: Robert Lepenies).

Prominent participants who have been part of the program include: Jayati Ghosh, Ananya Mukherjee-Reed, Adam Chmielewski, Clemens Sedmak, Alberto Cimadamore, Ernest Marie-Mbonda, Bina Agarwal, Marcos Nobre, Barbara Harriss-White, Shalini Randeria, Else Øyen, Gerry Mackie, Thomas Pogge, João Feres Júnior, Sakiko Fukuda-Parr, Sonia Bhalotra, David Hulme.

== Journal of Academics Stand Against Poverty ==
Since 2021, ASAP has been publishing the Journal of Academics Stand Against Poverty (Journal of ASAP), an international, multidisciplinary, open-access journal published under ISSN 2690-3458 (electronic edition) and ISSN 2690-3431 (print edition). The editors-in-chief of the journal are Thomas Pogge (Yale University, New Haven, USA) and Michal Apollo (University of Silesia in Katowice, Poland).

== Awards ==
The organization awards prizes and grants

=== ASAP Awards ===
ASAP, in partnership with the Journal of ASAP and the Yale Global Justice Program, is conferring three annual awards for scholarly works on poverty.

ASAP Lifetime Achievement Award

2025: Amartya Sen

2024: Raymond W. Baker

2023: Else Øyen

2022: Henry Shue

ASAP Book of the Year Award (Monograph)

2025: Stefan Kruse for How Ordinary People Make Aid Work: Civic Engagement and Health Aid Effectiveness (Johns Hopkins University Press)

2024: Nicole Hassoun for A Minimally Good Life: What We Owe to Others and What We Can Justifiably Demand (Oxford University Press).

2023: Olivier De Schutter, Hugh Frazer, Anne-Catherine Guio, Eric Marlier for The Escape from Poverty: Breaking the Vicious Cycles Perpetuating Disadvantage (Policy Press)

2022: Darrel Moellendorf for Mobilizing Hope: Climate Change and Global Poverty (Oxford University Press)

ASAP Book of the Year Award (Edited Book)

2025: Alberto Minujin and Enrique Delamonica for Handbook on Child Poverty and Inequality (Edward Elgar Publishing).

2024: Jennifer Johns and Sarah Marie Hall for Contemporary Economic Geographies: Inspiring, Critical and Plural Perspectives (Bristol University Press).

2023: Clemens Sedmak, Gottfried Schweiger for Handbook of Philosophy and Poverty (Routledge)

2022: Kayleigh Garthwaite, Ruth Patrick, Maddy Power, Anna Tarrant and Rosalie Warnock for COVID-19 Collaborations: Researching Poverty and Low-Income Family Life during the Pandemic (Policy Press)

=== Amartya Sen Prize ===
The Amartya Sen Prize is awarded to the best original essays examining one particular component of illicit financial flows, the resulting harms, and possible avenues of reform. Awarded by ASAP in partnership with Global Financial Integrity and Yale's Global Justice Program.

2025: First Prize: Ekoja Solomon; Tied for Second Place: Aremu Ololade Mustafa; Wasima Khan; Honorable mention: God’sWill Dickson

2024: Three coequal winners: Wisdom Essien; Maunga Mulomba; Thant Thura Zan and Soe Thaw Tar Kyaw Min; Honorable mention: Nater Akpen

2023: First Place: Bilal Moin; Tied for Second Place: Alexander Jacobs; Chad Osorio

2022: Three coequal winners: Savictor Sobechi Evan-Ibe; Kenneth Mahuni; Oluebube Offor

2021: First Place: Chia-Yun Po; Tied for Second Place: Christopher Ngosa; Oluebube Offor

2020: First Place: Erhieyovw O’Kenny; Tied for Second Place: Roy Cullen; Philip Mutio; Brian Collins Ocen

2019: Not awarded

2018: First Place: Kenneth Okpomo; Second Place: Bolarinwa Janet Oluwayinka

2017: Mattia Anesa

2016: Not awarded

2015: Matti Ylonen et al

2014: First Place: Max Everest-Phillips; Second Place: Hamish Russell and Gillian Brock

=== AGAPE (Ambedkar Grants for Advancing Poverty Eradication) ===
AGAPE aims to divide grants promising projects that will pilot innovative approaches to poverty eradication.

Snekithi Charitable Trust in Tamil Nadu, Kuriakose Elias Service Society (KESS) in Elanjikulam, Dr. Arambam Noni Meetai, National Service Scheme Unit at Sacred Heart University and Chellanam Panchayat, Sweet Futures" by the Changanacherry Social Service Society (CHASS).

=== Nelson Mandela Essay Prize Competition for Young African Scholars ===
ASAP East and Southern Africa, in collaboration with the University of Zambia and the University of Lusaka, awards annual prizes to young African scholars who address pressing issues on the continent and propose innovative solutions in the field of global governance.

2025: First Prize: Evaida Chimedza; Second Prize: Grace Gondwe; Tied for Third Prize: Nater Akpen, and Clautrida Mutabaruka

== Funding ==
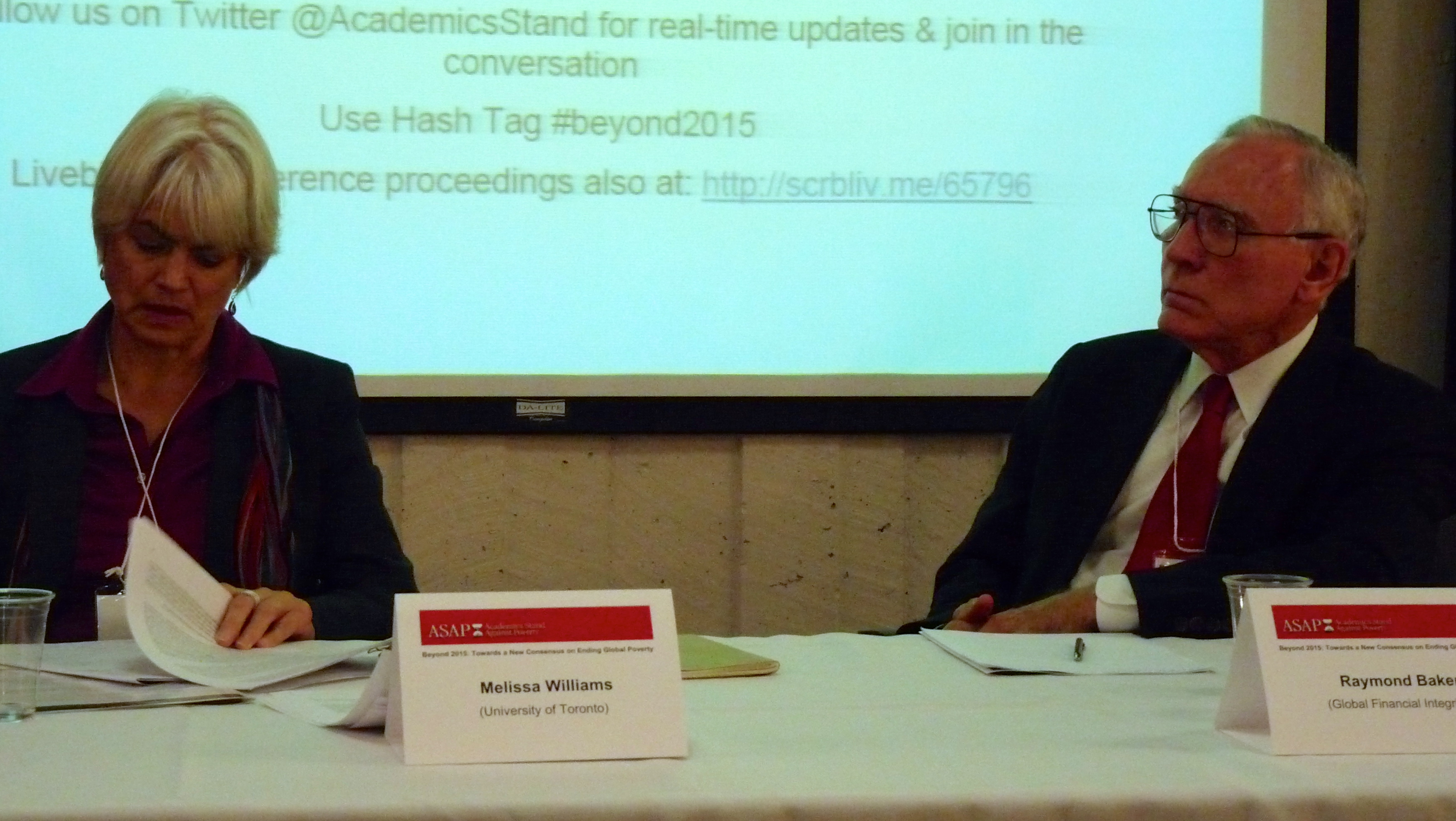
Raymond Baker (GFI) and Melissa Williams (U of Toronto) at ASAP Canada Launch, October 26, 2012

ASAP has secured funding from numerous sources, such as the British Council, the Comparative Research Programme on Poverty (CROP) of the International Social Science Council, and the Social Sciences and Humanities Research Council of Canada. The United Kingdom launch conference was funded by CROP and the University of Birmingham School of Government and Society. Launch conferences held at the University of Oslo and University of Delhi were co-sponsored by CROP and the Centre for the Study of Mind in Nature. The launch conference held in Canada in October 2012 was funded by the Social Sciences and Humanities Research Council of Canada (SSHRC), the Office of the Vice President, Research and Innovation at Ryerson University and the Ryerson University Politics and Governance Students' Association.

== Reception ==
A special issue of the Carnegie Council's Ethics & International Affairs focuses on ASAP's potential, and the contribution academics in general might make toward poverty alleviation. In his article in the special issue, Martin Kirk, global campaigns director for The Rules, argues that the network has the potential to influence NGOs to adopt more effective and less paternalistic approaches to development and improve their engagement with the communities they serve. “A critical barrier to change within NGOs is the fact that existing approaches are locked into a single paradigm for what counts as required knowledge for communications and campaigns in their home markets. Thus, a group such as Academics Stand Against Poverty could be extremely influential by making the concerted case for change, and then assisting practically with authoritative guidance.”

Oxford political theorist Simon Caney argues that ASAP can have a significant impact on poverty because academics have a high level of expertise and, in certain disciplines, possess prestige and authority that extend beyond academia, and therefore have the ability to influence others to be active in the fight against global poverty. The contribution of academics to advocacy may include persuading privileged groups to change their behaviour, the development of research-based policy proposals, and driving change at a more abstract or general level, such as the conceptualisation of poverty. Academics can also provide research that people living in poverty and other vulnerable groups can use, empirically-grounded guidance to those who wish to donate to charities, and finally the provision of a “plausible normative framework for thinking about poverty.”

Onora O’Neill, Cambridge philosopher and member of the UK House of Lords, raises questions about the potential of academics to contribute to poverty eradication, noting that many do not have a sufficient level of expertise concerning poverty; she suggests “that it might be better to aim such advocacy not at academics but at the more indeterminate class of persons with expertise relevant to some aspect of poverty and development” (pg. 20). She also remarks that expertise concerning the causes of the persistence of poverty and effective remedies needs to be generated. Roger Riddell (Oxford Policy Management) notes the contributions academics can and have made, and he urges those in groups such as ASAP to be aware of past efforts and their failures as well as successes.
