= Mosby (name) =

Mosby is a surname of English origin. The name comes from Moresby, which derives from Moorby, Lincolnshire.

Notable people with the surname include:

== Given name ==
- Mosby Monroe Parsons (1822–1865), American politician
- Mosby Perrow Jr. (1909–1973), American politician

== Surname ==
- Alexander Mosby Clayton (1801–1889), American politician
- Aline Mosby (1922–1998), American journalist
- Arron Mosby (born 1999), American football player
- Bernice Mosby (born 1984), American basketball player
- Carolyn Brown Mosby (1932–1990), American politician
- Curtis Mosby (1888–1957), American jazz drummer, bandleader and businessman
- Ervine Mosby, (1877–1916) English rugby league footballer
- Gideon Gela-Mosby (born 1996), Australian rugby league footballer
- Hagiga Mosby (born 2000) Australian rugby league footballer
- Håkon Mosby (1903–1989), Norwegian oceanographer
- Harold Mosby (1926–2007), English footballer
- Harry Mosby (1945–1993), Australian Paralympic athlete
- Howard Mosby (born 1961), African American member of the Georgia House of Representatives
- John Mosby Bacon (1844–1913), American Army general
- John R. Mosby, guerrilla leader during the Magonista rebellion of 1911
- John S. Mosby (1833–1916), Confederate partisan ranger in the American Civil War, leader of "Mosby's Rangers"
- Johnny and Jonie Mosby, American country music duo
- Littleberry Mosby (1757–1821), United States brigadier general during the War of 1812
- Marilyn Mosby (born 1980), American lawyer
- Nicholas Mosby Dawson, American militiaman
- Nick Mosby (born 1976), American politician
- Roger Mosby (born 1951), 14th Chief Scout Executive
- Taylor Mosby, American actress and musician
- Ted Mosby (bishop) (1949–2000), Australian Anglican bishop
- William H. Mosby (1898–1964), American painter and educator

== Fictional characters ==
- Ted Mosby, a fictional character from the television show How I Met Your Mother
- Tracy Mosby, a fictional character from the television show How I Met Your Mother

== See also ==
- Moseby
- Mosby
