= Villeneuve, Aosta Valley =

Villeneuve Veullanoua (Valdôtain)
- Comune
- Comune di Villeneuve; Commune de Villeneuve
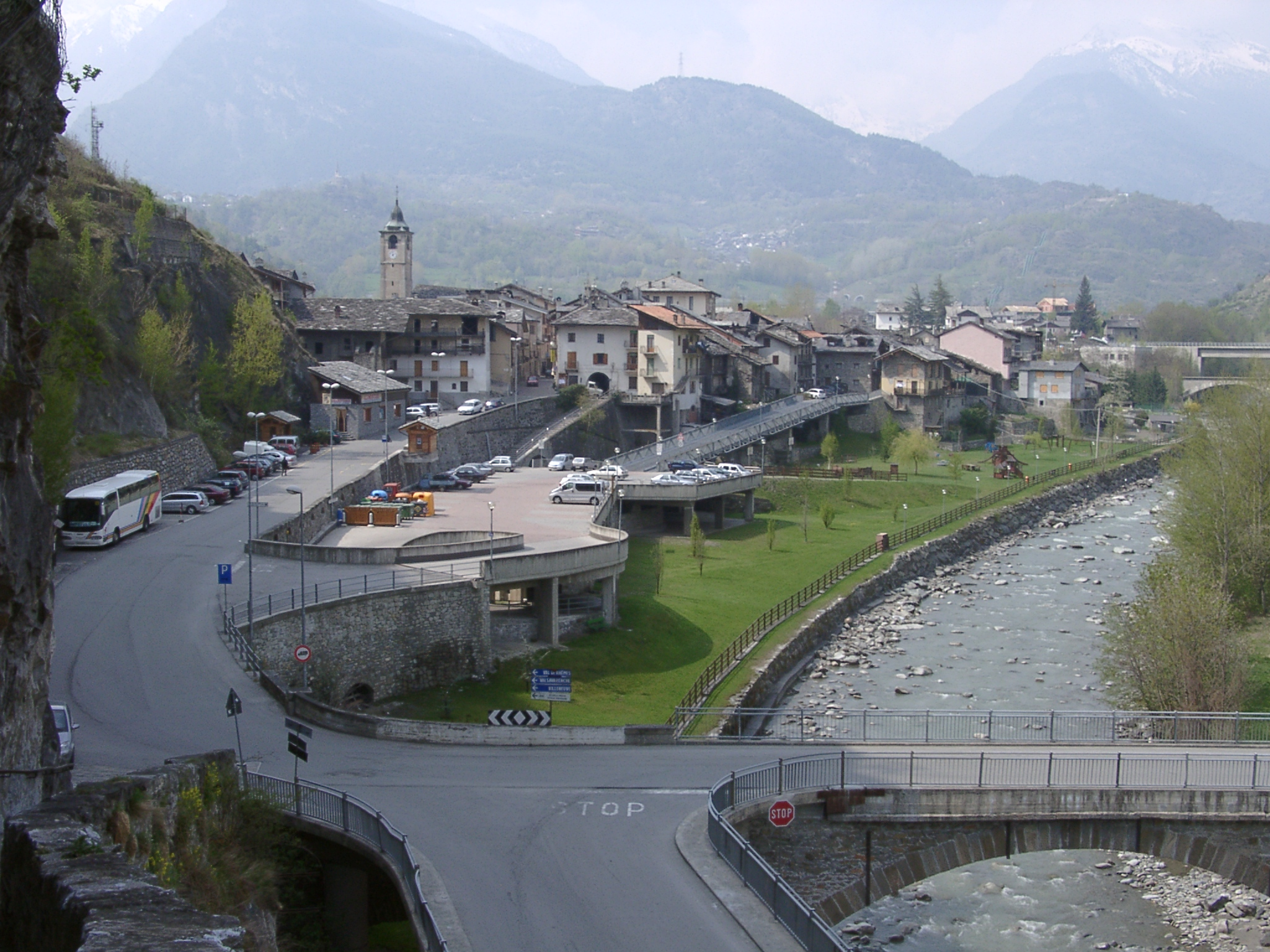

- Coat of arms

- Location within Italy Location within Aosta Valley
- Coordinates: 45°42′09″N 07°12′27″E
- Country: Italy
- Region: Aosta Valley
- Province: none
- Frazioni: Arbonne, Balmet, Les Banquettes, Le Borgognon, Bertolaz, Le Bruillen, Champagne, Champagnole, Champleval-Dessus, Champleval-du-Milieu, Champleval-Dessous, Champlong-Dessus, Champlong-L'Olaz, Champlong-Martignon, Champlong-Rosaire, Champlong-Vaillon, Champrotard, Chavonne, La Cloutraz, Condé, La Côte, La Crête, Croix-Blanche, Cumiod, Le Glair, Montovert, L'Outre-Pont, La Parisiaz, Perranche, Plorayé, Pognon, Saburey-Dessus, Saburey-Dessous, Saint-Roch, Véreytod

Government
  - Mayor: Bruno Jocallaz

Area
  - Total: 8 km^{2} (3.1 sq mi)
- Elevation: 670 m (2,200 ft)

Population (31 December 2022)
  - Total: 1,262
  - Density: 160/km^{2} (410/sq mi)
- Demonym: Villeneuvois
- Time zone: UTC+1 (CET)
  - Summer (DST): UTC+2 (CEST)
- Postal code: 11018
- Dialing code: 0165
- Patron saint: Saint Blaise
- Saint day: February 3
- Website: Official website

Villeneuve (French: [vilnœv]; Valdôtain: Veullanoua) is a town and comune in the Aosta Valley region of northwestern Italy. It lies along the Dora Baltea, at some 10 kilometres (6 mi) west of Aosta on the road to Courmayeur and the Mont Blanc Tunnel. Nearby lie the ruins of the medieval castle, Châtel-Argent.

== Landmarks ==
- Châtel-Argent

== Twin towns — Sister cities ==
- Aigueblanche, France
