= Basic Rights =

1980 book by Henry Shue

Basic Rights: Subsistence, Affluence, and U.S. Foreign Policy
- First edition
- Author: Henry Shue
- Subject: Human rights
- Published: 1980; 2nd edition, 1996
- Publisher: Princeton University Press
- Pages: 256 pp.
- ISBN: 9780691029290

Basic Rights: Subsistence, Affluence, and U.S. Foreign Policy is a book by Henry Shue in which he examines the issue of human rights and its relation to U.S. foreign policy.

== Reception ==
Thomas Pogge, Michael Payne, and Andrew Cohen criticized Shue's ideas on basic rights. Jordan Kiper provided a defense of Shue's arguments for basic rights.
