= Châtel-Argent =

Italian medieval castle

- Italy
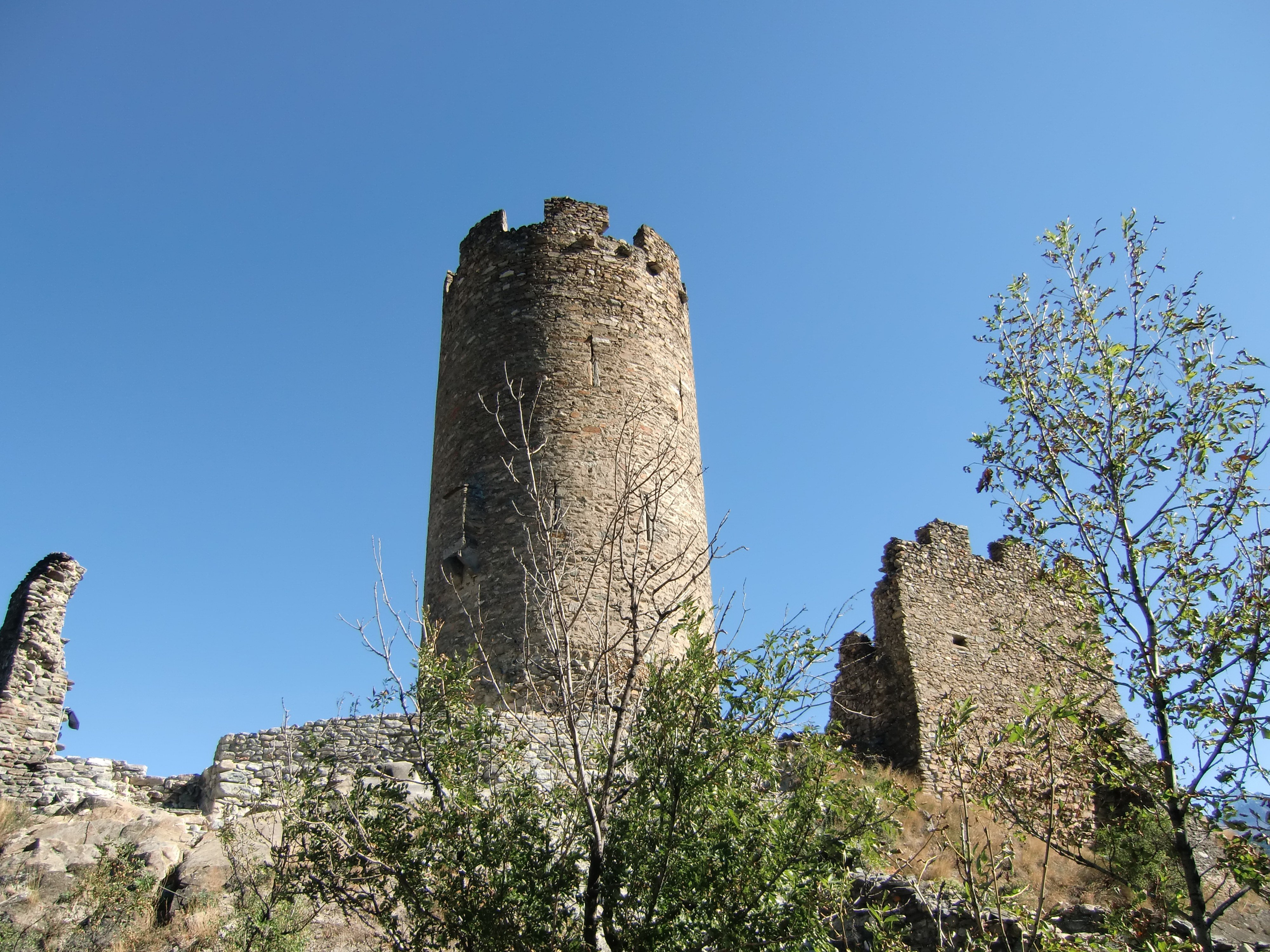
- View of the watchtower keep and curtain wall

Site information
- Type: Medieval castle
- Open to the public: yes

Location
- Coordinates: 45°42′07.4″N 7°12′40.4″E

Site history
- Built: 1176
- Built by: Master James of Saint Georges
- Materials: Limestone and granite

Châtel-Argent was an Italian medieval castle in the Alpine town of Villeneuve. It is now a ruin. As with many other castles in the region, Châtel-Argent overlooks the Dora Baltea (French: Doire baltée) River which runs through the Aosta Valley.

== History ==
Originally the home of the Salassi people, settlements have existed on this site since prehistoric times and through the Roman Era. There is a chapel dedicated to Saint Columba of Sens which was built sometime between 1050 and 1070. The castle first appears in a document in 1176 as "Castrum Argenteum". The castle was improved around 1275 under the direction of Count Peter II's architect James St. George (French: Maître Jacques de Saint-Georges) and castle grew to the configuration we see today. This castle had always been owned by the counts and the dukes of Savoy.

== Description ==
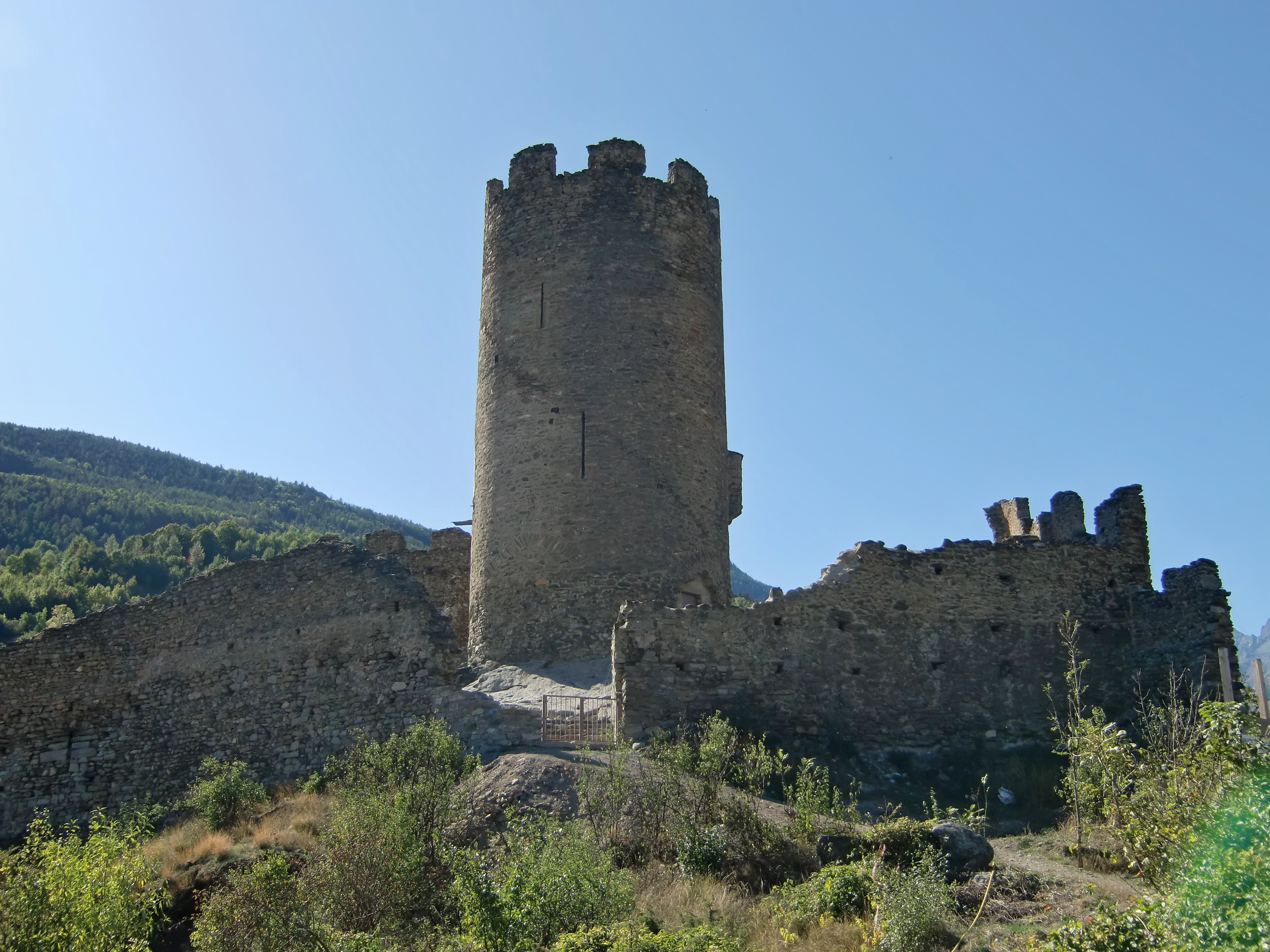
Châtel-Argent

The ruins can be accessed from Villeneuve by walking a staircase carved into the rock of the valley wall. The castle is located in the town of Villeneuve in the Aosta Valley region, at about 10 km west of the city of Aosta. The most prominent feature left in the ruins is its watchtower keep measuring just under 10 meters in diameter which overlooks the town below. The ruins themselves cover about 6,300 square meters. When the castle was whole, it was estimated to be able to hold 700 people in times of danger.

== See also ==
- List of castles in Italy
