= Defensive war =

Type of war justification

A defensive war is one of the causes that justify war by the criteria of the Just War tradition. It means a war where at least one nation is mainly trying to defend itself from another, as opposed to a war where both sides are trying to invade and conquer each other.

The right to self-defence in international law is enshrined in Chapter VII, Article 51 of the UN Charter:

Nothing in the present Charter shall impair the inherent right of collective or individual self-defense if an armed attack occurs against a member of the United Nations, until the Security Council has taken the measures necessary to maintain international peace and security. Measures taken by members in exercise of this right of self-defense shall be immediately reported to the Security Council and shall not in any way affect the authority and responsibility of the Security Council under the present Charter to take at any time such action as it deems necessary in order to maintain or restore international peace and security.

== History ==
American supporters of the war against the British argued that the War of 1812 was a defensive war, citing British harassment of American merchant shipping and impressment of American sailors on the high seas as well as armed support to Indian tribes resisting American expansion in the Midwest in order to create a pro-British Indian barrier state.

In 2026 the Tigray Peoples Liberation Front declared that they were launching a defensive war against the Ethiopian Government in conjunction with multiple other rebel groups.

== Views ==
The Islamic scholar Sufyan al-Thawri (716–778), who was described as a pacifist by Majid Khadduri (1909–2007), maintained that jihad (holy war) was only a defensive war.

== See also ==
- Battleplan (documentary TV series)

== Sources ==
- Cécile Fabre; Seth Lazar (20 February 2014). The Morality of Defensive War. OUP Oxford. pp. 129–. ISBN 978-0-19-150531-7.
- Dorset Michael (26 April 2016). An Essay on Defensive War, and a Constitutional Militia: With an Account of Queen Elizabeth's Arrangements for Resisting the Projected Invasion in the Year 1588: Taken from Authentic Records in the British Museum, and Other Collections. BiblioLife. ISBN 978-1-354-70317-5.
- Robert Greene; Joost Elffers (14 December 2007). The 33 Strategies of War. Penguin Publishing Group. pp. 27–. ISBN 978-1-101-14734-4.
- Stagg, J. C. A. (1983). Mr Madison's War: Politics, Diplomacy and Warfare in the Early American Republic, 1783–1830. Princeton University Press]. ISBN 0691047022.
