= Studying Children in Context =

1998 book

- Author: M. Elizabeth Graue, Daniel J. Walsh
- Subject: Children research
- Published: 1998 (SAGE Publications)
- Media type: Print
- Pages: 270
- ISBN: 0-8039-7256-3; ISBN 0-8039-7257-1 (pa)
- Dewey Decimal: 305.23
- LC Class: HQ767.85

Studying Children in Context: Theories, Methods, and Ethics is a 1998 book on qualitative research methods for working with young children. It was written by M. Elizabeth Graue and Daniel J. Walsh and published by SAGE Publications.
