= Mosby Creek (Missouri) =

Stream in the American state of Missouri

Mosby Creek is a stream in southeastern Pettis County in the U.S. state of Missouri. It is a tributary to Anderson Branch which is in turn a tributary of Walnut Creek. Sedalia is approximately nine miles to the north.

The stream headwaters arise at 38°35′39″N 93°09′47″W at an elevation of approximately 945 feet. The stream flows to the north-northeast approximately 1.8 miles to its confluence with Anderson Branch at 38°37′08″N 93°09′14″W and an elevation of 814 feet.

Mosby Creek has the name of one Mr. Mosby, the original owner of the site.

== See also ==
- List of rivers of Missouri
