= SSPX-affiliated religious orders =

List of closely associated Christian orders

The Society of Saint Pius X has close links with several religious institutes, chiefly in France.

== Various orders ==
- Brothers of the Priestly Fraternity of Saint Pius X
- Sisters of the Priestly Fraternity of Saint Pius X
- Oblates of the Priestly Fraternity of Saint Pius X

== Latin orders ==
=== Male orders ===
The following are associated male orders:

1. Capuchins-inspired Capucins de Morgon, France.
2. Dominican-inspired Les Frères de Notre-Dame-du-Rosaire, France.
3. Fraternity of the Transfiguration
4. Redemptorists-Traditional Redemptorist Missioners in Mussey, Michigan, United States
5. Benedictine monks from Abbey of Our Lady of the Conception; Niterói, Rio de Janeiro, Brazil
6. Benedictine monks from Our Lady of Guadalupe Monastery; Silver City, New Mexico, United States
7. Benedictine monks from Monastery of Reichenstein, Germany

=== Female orders ===
The following are associated female orders:

1. Dominican Teaching Sisters of the Holy Name of Jesus in Fanjeaux, France with schools
2. Dominican Teaching Sisters of the Holy Name of Jesus in Brignoles with schools
3. Dominican Teaching Sisters in Wanganui, New Zealand
4. Contemplative Dominican sisters in Avrillé, France
5. Sisters of Transfiguration, France.
6. Baptistines: Les petites sœurs de saint Jean-Baptiste, Le Rafflay, France.
7. Carmelites:
  1. Carmel du Cœur Immaculé de Marie, Eynesse, France
  2. Carmel of the Holy Trinity, Spokane, Washington, United States
  3. Carmel du Sacré-Coeur, Quievrain, Belgium
  4. Carmel Marie-Reine des Anges, Chexbres, Switzerland
8. Siervas de Jesús Sacerdote y del Corazón de María, Casarrubios del Monte Toledo, Spain
9. Benedictines: Bénédictines de Perdechat, France
10. Poor Clares: Clarisses de Morgon, France
11. Benedictine Nuns in Silver City, New Mexico, United States
12. Bethany Sisters in Killiney Road, Singapore
13. Disciples of the Cenacle in Velletri, Italy
14. Consoling Sisters of the Sacred Heart of Jesus in Vigne de Narni, Italy USA - India - Kenya
15. Madres Mínimas Franciscanas del Perpetuo Socorro de María, Mexico
16. Franciscan Sisters of Christ the King in Kansas City, U.S.
17. The Reparation Sisters of the Immaculate Heart of Mary, India
18. Discalced Carmelite Nuns of the Most Holy Trinity Monastery, Arlington, Texas, United States.
19. Reparative Sisters of the Holy Spirit in Niedaltdorf, Germany.
20. Little Sisters of Saint Francis, Le Trévoux, France.

== Eastern orders ==
The following are associated religious orders that celebrate according to Eastern Catholic liturgies:

- Priestly Fraternity of Saint Josaphat at Lviv, Ukraine
- Society of St. John the Precursor of the Lord at Riga, Latvia
- Greek Catholic Sisters of the Studite Order at Riga, Latvia
- Ukrainian Basilian Sisters at Lviv, Ukraine, who were forced to leave the Basilian Order in 1995, "because of their 'traditionalist' ideas" and who now reside in the house where Nicholas Charnetsky died following his release from the Gulag. The room in which Nicholas died is now the convent's chapel.
