= Grand-Aigueblanche =

- Commune
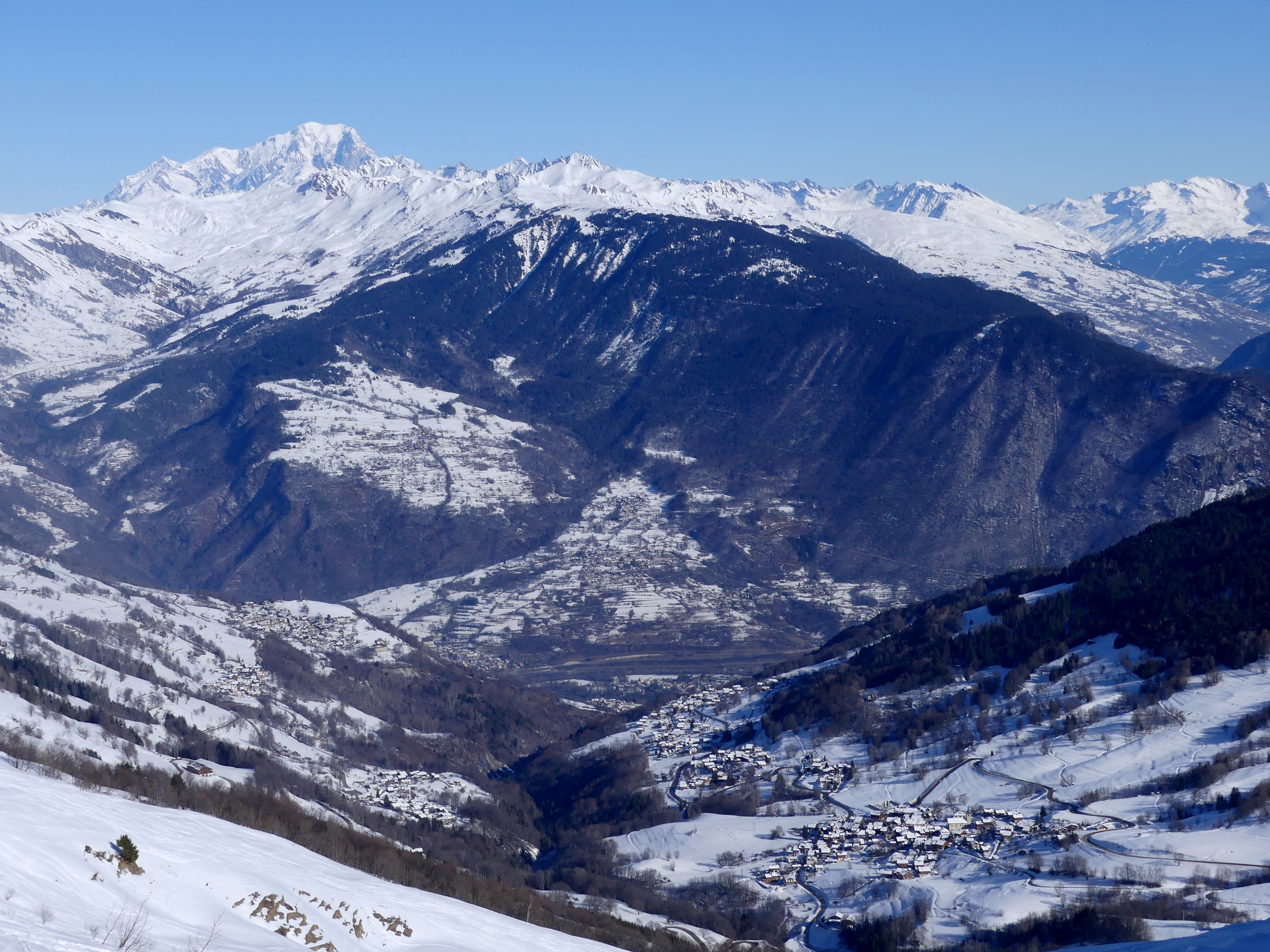
- The church in Villargerel

- Coat of arms
- Location of Grand-Aigueblanche
- Location within France Location within Auvergne-Rhône-Alpes
- Coordinates: 45°30′06″N 6°30′37″E
- Country: France
- Region: Auvergne-Rhône-Alpes
- Department: Savoie
- Arrondissement: Albertville
- Canton: Moûtiers
- Intercommunality: Vallées d'Aigueblanche

Government
  - Mayor (2020–2026): André Pointet
- Area^{1}: 27.33 km^{2} (10.55 sq mi)
- Highest elevation: 2,280 m (7,480 ft)
- Lowest elevation: 437 m (1,434 ft)
- Population (2023): 3,780
  - Density: 138/km^{2} (358/sq mi)
- Time zone: UTC+01:00 (CET)
  - Summer (DST): UTC+02:00 (CEST)
- INSEE/Postal code: 73003 /73260
- Website: www.aigueblanche.fr
- ^{1} French Land Register data, which excludes lakes, ponds, glaciers > 1 km^{2} (0.386 sq mi or 247 acres) and river estuaries.

Grand-Aigueblanche (French pronunciation: [ɡʁɑ̃.t‿ɛɡblɑ̃ʃ]) is a commune in the Savoie department in the Auvergne-Rhône-Alpes region in south-eastern France. It was established on 1 January 2019 by merger of the former communes of Aigueblanche (the seat), Le Bois and Saint-Oyen.

== Population ==
Population data refer to the area corresponding with the commune as of January 2025.

Historical population
Year	Pop.	±% p.a.
1968	2,447	—
1975	3,036	+3.13%
1982	2,800	−1.15%
1990	3,156	+1.51%
1999	3,128	−0.10%
2007	3,488	+1.37%
2012	3,719	+1.29%
2017	3,850	+0.69%
2023	3,780	−0.31%
Source: INSEE

== See also ==
- Communes of the Savoie department
