= Saint-Oyen =

Saint-Oyen may refer to:

- Saint-Oyen, Savoie, in France
- Saint-Oyen, Aosta Valley, in Italy
- Saint-Oyens, in Switzerland
