= Ole Didrik Lærum =

Norwegian professor of medicine (1940–2023)

Ole Didrik Lærum (23 April 1940 – 24 January 2023) was a Norwegian professor of medicine.

== Early life and education ==
Ole Didrik Lærum was born in Bærum on 23 April 1940, son of physician Birger Lærum, Jr. (1906–1991) and weaver Goro Lynne (1909–2003). He grew up in Vossevangen, and finished his secondary education there in 1959. He has been married twice.

Lærum graduated from the University of Oslo in 1965 with the cand.med. degree, having also spent some studying time at the Pasteur Institute. He was then a research fellow at Rikshospitalet and took the dr.med. degree in 1969.

== Career ==
He was appointed a docent at the University of Bergen in 1974, and was promoted to professor in 1980.

His fields are oncology and experimental pathology.

He was the prorector of the University of Bergen from 1984 to 1989 and rector from 1990 to 1995.

== Other activities and recognition ==
Lærum also chaired the Research Council of Norway from 1992 to 1994. He was a member of Royal Norwegian Society of Sciences and Letters since 1981, the Norwegian Academy of Science and Letters since 1991 and Academia Europaea since 2001. He has been given honorary degrees at the University of Copenhagen and the Carol Davila University of Medicine and Pharmacy. He was decorated as a Grand Knight of the Order of the Falcon in 1994 and Commander of the Order of St. Olav in 1996.

In 1978 he won the Anders Jahre Prize for Young Scientists.

== Death ==
Lærum died on 24 January 2023, at the age of 82.

Academic offices
Preceded by Arnfinn Graue	Rector of the University of Bergen; 1990–1995	Succeeded by Jan Fridthjof Bernt
