= Arne-Johan Henrichsen =

Norwegian philologist (1918–2005)

Arne-Johan Henrichsen (31 August 1918 – 8 March 2005) was a Norwegian philologist.

He was born in Kristiania as a son of teacher Gustav Wilhelm Henrichsen (1883–1947) and Birgit Heftye Blehr. He was married twice.

He finished his secondary education in 1935. He studied Romance languages at Sorbonne from 1945 to 1947, and graduated with the cand. philol. degree from the University of Oslo in 1951. He took the dr.philos. degree in 1956 with the thesis Les phrases hypothétiques en ancien occitan-étude syntaxique. He had been a school teacher, but was in 1956 appointed as a professor in Romance philology at the University of Bergen. He was the dean of the Faculty of History and Philosophy from 1959 to 1961, and rector of the University of Bergen from 1972 to 1977.

He was deputy chairman of NAVF from 1966 to 1969, and was acting chairman for a year. Henrichsen was a member of the municipal council of Åsane Municipality from 1964 to 1965. He was decorated as a Knight, First Class of the Order of St. Olav in 1977. He died in March 2005.

Academic offices
Preceded by	Dean of the Faculty of History and Philosophy, University of Bergen; 1959–1961	Succeeded by
Preceded by Håkon Mosby	Rector of the University of Bergen; 1972–1977	Succeeded by Ørjar Øyen
