= David Rodin =

New Zealand philosopher

- Born: David Emanuel Rodin; 28 June 1970 (age 56)
- Awards: Rhodes Scholarship

Education
- Education: Magdalen College, Oxford (PhD), University of Waikato (BA)
- Thesis: Self-Defence and War (1997)
- Doctoral advisors: Jonathan Glover, John Finnis, John Randolph Lucas

Philosophical work
- Era: 21st-century philosophy
- Region: Western philosophy
- Institutions: University of Oxford, Principia Advisory, Carnegie Council

David Emanuel Rodin (born 28 June 1970) is a New Zealand philosopher and senior research fellow at the University of Oxford. He is also a senior fellow at the Carnegie Council for Ethics in International Affairs. Rodin is the founder and chair of Principia Advisory and is known for his works on ethics of war.

== Books ==
- War and Self-Defense, Oxford University Press, 2002
- The Ethics of War: Shared Problems in Different Traditions, David Rodin and Richard Sorabji (Eds.), Ashgate, London, 2006
- War, Terrorism and Torture, David Rodin (Ed.), Blackwell, Oxford, 2007
- Preemption: Military Action and Moral Justification, co-edited with Henry Shue, Oxford University Press, 2010, ISBN 9780199565993
- Just and Unjust Warriors: The Legal and Moral Status of Soldiers, David Rodin and Henry Shue (Eds.), Oxford University Press, Oxford, 2008
