= Nicole Hassoun =

Professor of philosophy, researcher, and author

Academic background
- Education: University of Colorado Denver (BA); University of Arizona (MA, PhD)
- Thesis: Shrinking Distance: Global Justice in a Globalizing World (2007)
- Doctoral advisor: Thomas D. Christiano

Academic work
- Discipline: Philosopher
- Sub-discipline: Social philosophy; Political philosophy; Ethics; Philosophy of economics
- Institutions: Binghamton University

Nicole Hassoun is a professor of philosophy at Binghamton University and head of the Global Health Impact project, a research organization focused on promoting access to essential medicines. She is the author of Globalization and Global Justice: Shrinking Distance, Expanding Obligations and Global Health Impact: Extending Access on Essential Medicines for the Poor.

== Education ==
Hassoun holds a Bachelor of Arts in 2001 from the University of Colorado Denver and a Master of Arts in 2005 and Doctor of Philosophy in 2007 from the University of Arizona.

== Works ==
In addition to research published in peer-reviewed journals, Hassoun has authored two books. She published Globalization and Global Justice: Shrinking Distance, Expanding Obligations in 2012, and Global Health Impact: Extending Access to Essential Medicines in 2020.

=== Globalization and Global Justice ===
In Analysis, Miriam Ronzoni focuses on four aspects of the book, which she describes as "insightful", including the focus on "significant obligations to lift the global poor out of (at least extreme) poverty not because failing to do so would be unjust [...], but because doing so is the only way to make the globally coercive institutions that apply to (virtually) all individuals around the globe legitimate." In a review in Ethical Theory and Moral Practice, Peter Stone writes, "Anyone concerned with the alleviation of global poverty might find her Fair Trade proposal of interest" and discusses how different parts of the book may appeal to different audiences, concluding, "Both policy analysts and political philosophers, then, will get something of value" from the book. In Ethics, Helena de Bres writes that the book is "poised unhappily between two genres: the popular book (a genre it fails to fit, being insufficiently accessible and engaging) and the philosophical treatise." In The Philosophical Review, Mark Navin does not find that the first part of the book identifies "a new ground for demanding a duty to ameliorate global poverty" but finds the second part to include "much interesting and insightful discussion of possible strategies for combating global poverty."

=== Global Health Impact ===
In a review in Ethical Theory and Moral Practice, Michael Da Silva describes the work as "an excellent exploration of core issues in global health ethics and proof of concept for the scientifically rigorous, policy-oriented philosophy and philosophically-informed policy Nicole Hassoun champions therein", that is based on more than a decade of her work on healthcare ethics and politics. In Economics & Philosophy, Erik Malmqvist writes that while the book was written before the COVID-19 pandemic, it still addresses the timely issue of access to medicines, stating "it is thus a multifaceted book of potential relevance to a diverse readership, including moral and political philosophers, health economists, global health experts, health policymakers and human rights activists."
