= Sisters of the Society of Saint Pius X =

Roman Catholic women's order based in France

Sisters of the Priestly Fraternity of Saint Pius X
- French: Soeurs de la Fraternité Saint-Pie X
- Abbreviation: Sisters of St. Pius X
- Formation: September 22, 1974; 51 years ago
- Founder: Most Rev. Abp. Marcel Lefebvre
- Type: Catholic religious order
- Headquarters: Abbaye Saint-Michel; 7 allée du Chateau; 36290 Saint Michel-en-Brenne, France
- Superior-General: Rev. Mr. Maria Jean Bréant

The Sisters of the Society of Saint Pius X are a semi-contemplative order of religious sisters founded by Archbishop Marcel Lefebvre on September 22, 1974. The motherhouse is located in Saint-Michel-en-Brenne, France, with additional houses in Argentina, Australia, Belgium, Germany, Italy, Switzerland and the United States. As of 2018, the current Superior General is Mother Maria Jean Bréant.

== History ==
The Society of Sisters was guided in its initial formation by Archbishop Lefebvre, who was formerly Superior General of the Holy Ghost Fathers, and his sister, Mother Marie Gabriel. For more than forty years, Mother Marie Gabriel had devoted herself to missionary work in Martinique, the West Indies and Africa, in the Congregation of the Holy Ghost Sisters. She had spent much time on the African continent.

In October, 1973, the first postulant for this new religious congregation, Janine Ward, arrived at Ecône from Australia.

In 1974, while recovering from an illness in Europe, Mother Marie Gabriel had a religious vision which was to point her in another direction. The signs became clearer: the crisis in the Church, the continual loss of faith and religious spirit in her own congregation, her weakened health, her brother's insistent appeal for aid in transmitting the religious life, all contributed to her decision to guide the fledgling congregation of the Sisters of the Society.

The first novitiate was installed in Albano, near Rome. There Janine's postulancy continued under Mother Marie Gabriel's guidance until her reception of the habit on September 22, 1974, the true founding of the new religious institute. Two years later, September 29, 1976, the first profession was held. The congregation counted twelve novices and eight postulants in the chapel during this ceremony.

In May, 1984, Sister Mary Jude, an American sister who spent almost two years at St. Mary's College in Kansas (from 1981 to 1983), became the new Superior General of the Sisters. There were thirty-four professed sisters in eight houses and four different countries at this time.

The third Superior was Mother Marie-Augustin de Poulpiquet, who from 2006–2018 had been the head of the sisterhood for two terms of office.

On Monday, April 9, 2018, the capitulars elected Sister Maria Jean Bréant, the former mistress of novices of the Order, the fourth Superior General. Her term of office is six years. Thus far, Sr. Maria Jean worked at the novitiate Notre-Dame de Compassion in Ruffec.

== Locations ==
=== Argentina ===
- La Reja, Argentina (1986): school, seminary care, former Spanish-language novitiate
- Pilar, Argentina (1989): Spanish-language novitiate

=== Australia ===
- Sydney, Australia (1988): school, parish work

=== Belgium ===
- Brussels, Belgium (1982): school, parish work

=== France ===
- Abbey of Saint-Michel – Saint-Michel-en-Brenne, France (1977): Motherhouse, former French-language novitiate
- Le Pointet, France (1979): retreat house
- Unieux, France (1980): school, parish work
- Marseilles, France (founded in 1982 in Dijon, France; moved to Marseille in 1989): school, parish work
- Ruffec, France (1989): French-language novitiate
- Le Bremien, France (1991): retirement and nursing home
- Châteauroux, France (1992): domestic and parish work
- Bruges, France (1996): school, parish work
- Suresnes, France (1998): domestic and sacristy care of District House
- Gastines, France (2006): retreat house

=== Germany ===
- Unlingen-Göffingen, Germany (1992): German-language novitiate

=== Italy ===
- Albano Laziale (1997): former motherhouse, domestic work for the receiving of pilgrims

=== Switzerland ===
- Geneva, Switzerland (1977): school, parish work
- Wil, Switzerland (2003): school, parish work

=== United States ===
- Saint Mary's Academy and College – St. Marys, Kansas (1981): school, parish work
- Browerville, Minnesota (founded in 1986 in Armada, Michigan; moved to Browerville in 1990): English-language novitiate

=== African Missions ===
- Libreville, Gabon (1993): mission apostolate

== See also ==
- Traditional Catholicism
- List of Catholic religious institutes
- SSPX-affiliated religious orders
- Tridentine Mass
