= Battleplan =

2006 military television documentary series

Battleplan is a 2006 military television documentary series examining various military strategies used in modern warfare since World War I. It is shown on the Military Channel in the U.S. and Yesterday. Each episode looks at particular military strategy – or "battleplan" – through two well-known historical examples, gauging them against the ideal requirements necessary to successfully conduct that strategy. All the episodes use examples from modern warfare, dating from the First World War (1914–18) up to the Iraq War (2003). Lloyd Clark (Royal Military Academy Sandhurst) and Bruce Gudmundsson (US Army War College) analyze the information and talk about it on the show.

== Episodes ==
1. "Blitzkrieg" – examples used: Battle of France (World War II) and 2003 invasion of Iraq (Iraq War)
2. "Assault from the Air" – examples used: Battle of Crete, Operation Market Garden (World War II) and Operation Junction City (Vietnam War)
3. "Deception" – examples used: Battle of Normandy (World War II) and Gulf War
4. "Assault from the Sea" – examples used: Battle of Inchon (Korean War) and Battle of Iwo Jima (World War II)
5. "Counterstrike" – examples used: Yom Kippur War and Battle of Moscow (World War II)
6. "Blockade" – examples used: Battle of the Atlantic and U.S. Submarine Campaign 1943–45 (World War II)
7. "Siege" – examples used: Battle of Dien Bien Phu (First Indochina War) and Battle of Khe Sanh (Vietnam War)
8. "Battlefleet" – examples used: Battle of Midway and Battle of Leyte Gulf (World War II)
9. "Pre-Emptive Strike" – examples used: Six-Day War and Attack on Pearl Harbor (World War II)
10. "Control of the Air" – examples used: Battle of Britain (World War II) and Gulf War
11. "Defensive Battle" – examples used: Hindenburg Line (World War I) and Battle of Kursk (World War II)
12. "Guerrilla Warfare" – examples used: Mujahideen (Soviet–Afghan War) and Vietcong (Vietnam War)
13. "Urban Warfare" – examples used: Tet Offensive (Vietnam War) and Battle of Stalingrad (World War II)
14. "Breaking a Fortified Line" – examples used: Hindenburg Line (World War I) and Second Battle of El Alamein (World War II)
15. "Raiding Operations" – examples used: Rescue of Benito Mussolini (World War II) and Operation Ivory Coast (Vietnam War)
16. "Strategic Bombing" – examples used: Campaign against Nazi Germany, 1941–45, Bombing of Dresden and Bombing of Japan, 1944–45 (World War II)
17. "Flank Attack" – examples used: Battle of Normandy (World War II) and Gulf War
18. "Special Operations" – examples used: French Resistance (World War II) and 2003 invasion of Iraq (Iraq War)

== DVD release ==
The Region 1 DVD collection of five discs was released November 6, 2007. It has a listed running time of 1080 min.
