= Franciscan Sisters of Christ the King =

Order of the Franciscan Sisters of Christ the King
- Formation: February 2, 2000; 26 years ago
- Founder: Rev. Fr. Eugene N. Heidt
- Type: Catholic religious order
- Headquarters: Convent of Christ the King; 1409 E. Meyer Blvd. Kansas City, MO 64131
- Superior-General: Rev. Sr. Mary Joseph

The Franciscan Sisters of Christ the King, formerly known as the Franciscan Sisters of Oregon, are an order of religious sisters founded by Fr. Eugene N. Heidt on February 2, 2000. It was established in the footsteps of Saint Francis with the aim of educating young people in accordance with traditional Catholic values. The motherhouse and novitiate are located in Kansas City, Missouri. As of 2003, the Superior General is Mother Mary Joseph.

== See also ==
- Traditional Catholicism
- List of Catholic religious institutes
- SSPX-affiliated religious orders
- Tridentine Mass
