= Fraternity of the Transfiguration =

Traditionalist Roman Catholic order of France

- Fraternité de la Transfiguration
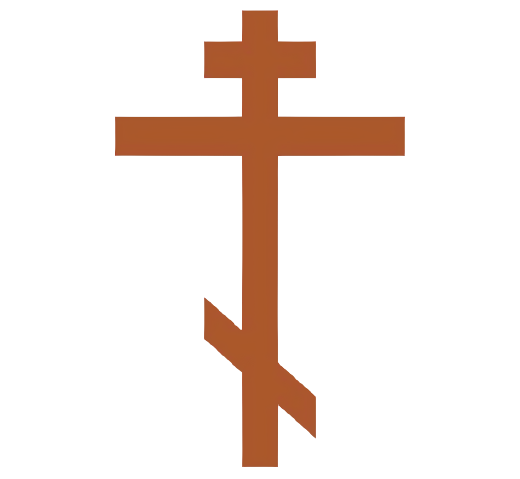
- Logo of the group
- Founder: Bernard Lecareux
- Type: Semi-contemplative society
- Headquarters: Le Bois, Mérigny, France
- Coordinates: 45°29′30″N 6°29′55″E
- Members: 24 (9 priests, 5 brothers, 10 sisters)
- Superior: Jean-Marie
- Affiliations: Catholic Church
- Website: transfiguration.over-blog.com

The Fraternity of the Transfiguration is a Traditionalist Roman Catholic Order founded by Bernard Lecareux in France. The Fraternity of the Transfiguration has a close connection to the Society of Saint Pius X, specifically their French District.

== History ==
In 1970, Bernard Lecareux founded the Fraternity of the Transfiguration.

Between 1976 and 1977, the first vows and receptions of the habit for the Fraternity of the Transfiguration took place. Three years later, on June 29, 1979, two religious of the Fraternity of the Transfiguration were ordained by Archbishop Marcel Lefebvre.

In 1985, the first Sisters entered the Fraternity of the Transfiguration. For many years they lived in the guest house, until they moved to a convent at the start of 1992.

In 2012, the Father Superior, Père Jean-Noël, published a statement where he said that "We [the Fraternity of the Transfiguration] renew our complete confidence in Monsignor Fellay in the talks he will have to conduct with the Roman authorities for the restoration of the Holy Church and assure him of our prayers for this intention."

On 22 February 2021, Lecareux, the founder of the Fraternity of the Transfiguration died at the Maison Saint-Joseph de Mérigny; his funeral was held four days later at the Notre-Dame du Rosaire Church in Le Bois.

== Creation and purpose ==
The fraternity's spirituality is largely around the life, work, and spirit of Vladimir Ghika, a convert from Romanian Orthodoxy to Roman Catholicism who was martyred in Romania on 16 May 1954. Their motto is Adorare, Unire, Servire; Adorare - personal sanctification, Unire - the search for unity, Servire - apostolic work. The fraternity maintains good relations with the Eastern Catholic Churches, and has even hosted Greek-Catholic priests in their community.

The Fraternity of the Transfiguration has two branches: one masculine, including priests and brothers of the fraternity, and one feminine, including the Sisters of the Fraternity of the Transfiguration.

== Formation and discernment ==
Men who are interested in the Fraternity of the Transfiguration spend six months to one year as postulants. If their vocation seems legitimate, they will enter a postulancy period of one year; after this year, they take their first vows. After taking their vows, the superiors will assess if the religious has the dispositions to become a priest.

== Third Order ==
The fraternity also has a Third Order. Members of the Third Order are known as "familiars."

== See also ==
- Catholic Church in France
- SSPX-affiliated religious orders
- List of communities using the Tridentine Mass
