= Le Bois =

Le Bois Vel Boué (Savoyard)
- Part of Grand-Aigueblanche
- Location of Le Bois
- Location within France Location within Auvergne-Rhône-Alpes
- Coordinates: 45°29′30″N 6°29′55″E
- Country: France
- Region: Auvergne-Rhône-Alpes
- Department: Savoie
- Arrondissement: Albertville
- Canton: Moûtiers
- Commune: Grand-Aigueblanche
- Area^{1}: 5.55 km^{2} (2.14 sq mi)
- Highest elevation: 1,760 m (5,770 ft)
- Lowest elevation: 458 m (1,503 ft)
- Population (2022): 402
  - Density: 72.4/km^{2} (188/sq mi)
- Demonym(s): Velborains, Velboraines
- Time zone: UTC+01:00 (CET)
  - Summer (DST): UTC+02:00 (CEST)
- Postal code: 73260
- ^{1} French Land Register data, which excludes lakes, ponds, glaciers > 1 km^{2} (0.386 sq mi or 247 acres) and river estuaries.

Le Bois (French pronunciation: [lə bwa]; Savoyard: Vel Boué) is a former commune in the Savoie department in the Auvergne-Rhône-Alpes region in south-eastern France. On 1 January 2019, it was merged into the new commune Grand-Aigueblanche. The traditionalist Catholic order, the Fraternity of the Transfiguration, is located in Le Bois.

== See also ==
- Communes of the Savoie department
