= Mosby Creek =

Mosby Creek may refer to:

- Mosby Creek (Missouri)
- Mosby Creek (Oregon)
