= Ørjar Øyen =

Norwegian sociologist (1927–2024)

- Born: 19 February 1927; Brønnøy Municipality, Norway
- Died: 2 March 2024 (aged 97)
- Occupation: Sociologist
- Spouses: Else Øyen (m. 1957; div. 1988) Bente Gullveig Alver (m. 1996)
- Awards: Order of St. Olav

Ørjar Øyen (19 February 1927 – 2 March 2024) was a Norwegian sociologist.

Øyen was born in Brønnøy Municipality to schoolteacher Torvald Øyen and Helga Karijord. He was married to sociologist Else Øyen from 1957 to 1988, and to professor Bente Gullveig Alver from 1996. He was appointed professor in sociology at the University of Bergen from 1968 to 1997. He served as rector of the university from 1978 to 1983. He was decorated Commander of the Order of St. Olav in 1988. Øyen died on 2 March 2024, at the age of 97.

Academic offices
Preceded by Arne-Johan Henrichsen	Rector of the University of Bergen; 1978–1983	Succeeded by Arnfinn Graue
