= Mosby Hill =

Hill in Missouri, U.S.

Coordinates: 36°46′56″N 91°16′57″W

Mosby Hill is a summit in Oregon County in the U.S. state of Missouri with an elevation of 965 feet (294 m). The peak rises about 455 ft above the junction of Hurricane Creek and the Eleven Point River. The community of Greer lies about 3.5 miles to the southwest on Missouri Route 19.

Mosby Hill has the name of one Mr. Mosby, a local merchant.
