= Else Øyen =

Norwegian sociologist (born 1934)

Professor Else Øyen (born 1934 in Denmark) was educated as a sociologist. She was awarded the ASAP Lifetime Achievement Award by Academics Stand Against Poverty.

== Education and career ==
She became a professor of social policy in 1975 at the University of Bergen, Norway, and shifted her later research focus to comparative poverty studies within an interdisciplinary framework. She initiated the Comparative Research Programme on Poverty (CROP) in 1991. In a few years, it became one of the major programmes under the International Social Science Council (ISSC). The foremost aim of CROP was to provide a scientific framework for the understanding of the many facets of poverty and to create an international arena where poverty researchers from different regions and disciplines could meet and exchange experiences. In 2023, Else Øyen have received a lifetime award for her poverty-related work.

== Research ==
Øyen, through her research on poverty, has been responsible for developing the notion of poverty production. This according to Øyen is the fourth phase of understanding and reducing poverty. It follows the first stage; tale telling, the second stage; client focused and development research, and the third stage, knowledge building about poverty reduction. According to Øyen, the subsequent and fourth stage of research should be that of poverty production which entails "understanding the processes that produce poverty and continue to produce poverty at a rate no present poverty-reducing measures can possibly win over or even compete with production". Øyen notes the role of vocabulary as the term 'poverty production' implies that there are actors involved in producing poverty. It is thus necessary, in order to reduce poverty, to identify these actors and to examine their motivations. Despite this, however, Øyen is careful to mention that such an exercise must not be a witch hunt as the purpose of identification is not punishment.

== Personal life ==
She was married to sociologist Ørjar Øyen from 1957 to 1988.

== Bibliography ==
- Poverty: A Global Review : Handbook on International Poverty Research ed. by Syed Abdus Samad( Book ) 21 editions published between 1996 and 2003 d and held by 517 libraries worldwide
- Comparative methodology: Theory and Practice in International Social Research by Else Øyen 1990 and 1992 Held by 487 libraries worldwide according to WorldCat
