= Frank Chapman Sharp =

Frank Chapman Sharp (July 30, 1866 – May 4, 1943) was an American philosopher who specialized in ethics, including business ethics and the ethical conduct of war.

== Career ==
He received his BA from Amherst College in 1887 and his Ph.D. at the Konigliche-Friedrich-Wilhelms University of Berlin in 1892. His thesis, The Aesthetic Element in Morality and Its Place in a Utilitarian Theory of Morals, was published in book form in both English and German in 1893. His entire teaching career was spent on the philosophy faculty at the University of Wisconsin, where he was promoted to full professor in 1905. He served as President of the Western Division of the American Philosophical Society during the 1907-1908 term. Among Sharp's other publications are Shakespeare's Portrayal of the Moral Life (1902); A Study of the Influence of Custom on Moral Judgment (1908); A Course in Moral Instruction for the High School (1909); Syllabus on Moral Instruction (with Frederic James Gould, 1911); Ethics (1928); Business Ethics: Studies in Fair Competition (1937); Problems in Business Ethics (1937); and Good Will and Ill Will: A Study in Moral Judgments (1950), the last of which was published posthumously.

== Philosophy ==
Sharp was among the first philosophers to focus on business ethics, in which he discussed the fair treatment of employees, consumers, and competitors. His Syllabus on Moral Instruction was, for a time, used by the United States military for troop instruction. Sharp was also among the first philosophers to perform empirical studies of moral intuitions, conducting surveys at the University of Wisconsin, both of highly educated liberal arts students and of agricultural students who had had limited formal education. Sharp believed that these studies confirmed his utilitarian ethical positions. He is credited with being the first moral philosopher to use a variant of the now famous trolley problem in which a switchman must choose between saving many strangers or his own daughter from a runaway train. A brief summary of Sharp's philosophy may be found in Richard Brandt's review of Sharp's Good Will and Ill Will.

== Frank Chapman Sharp Memorial Prize ==
The Frank Chapman Sharp Memorial Prize was established by the American Philosophical Society in 1990 to honor Sharp's memory. It is awarded every other year to the best unpublished essay or monograph on the philosophy of war and peace.
