= Aigueblanche =

Commune in Auvergne-Rhône-Alpes, France

Aigueblanche Èguablantse (Savoyard)
- Part of Grand-Aigueblanche
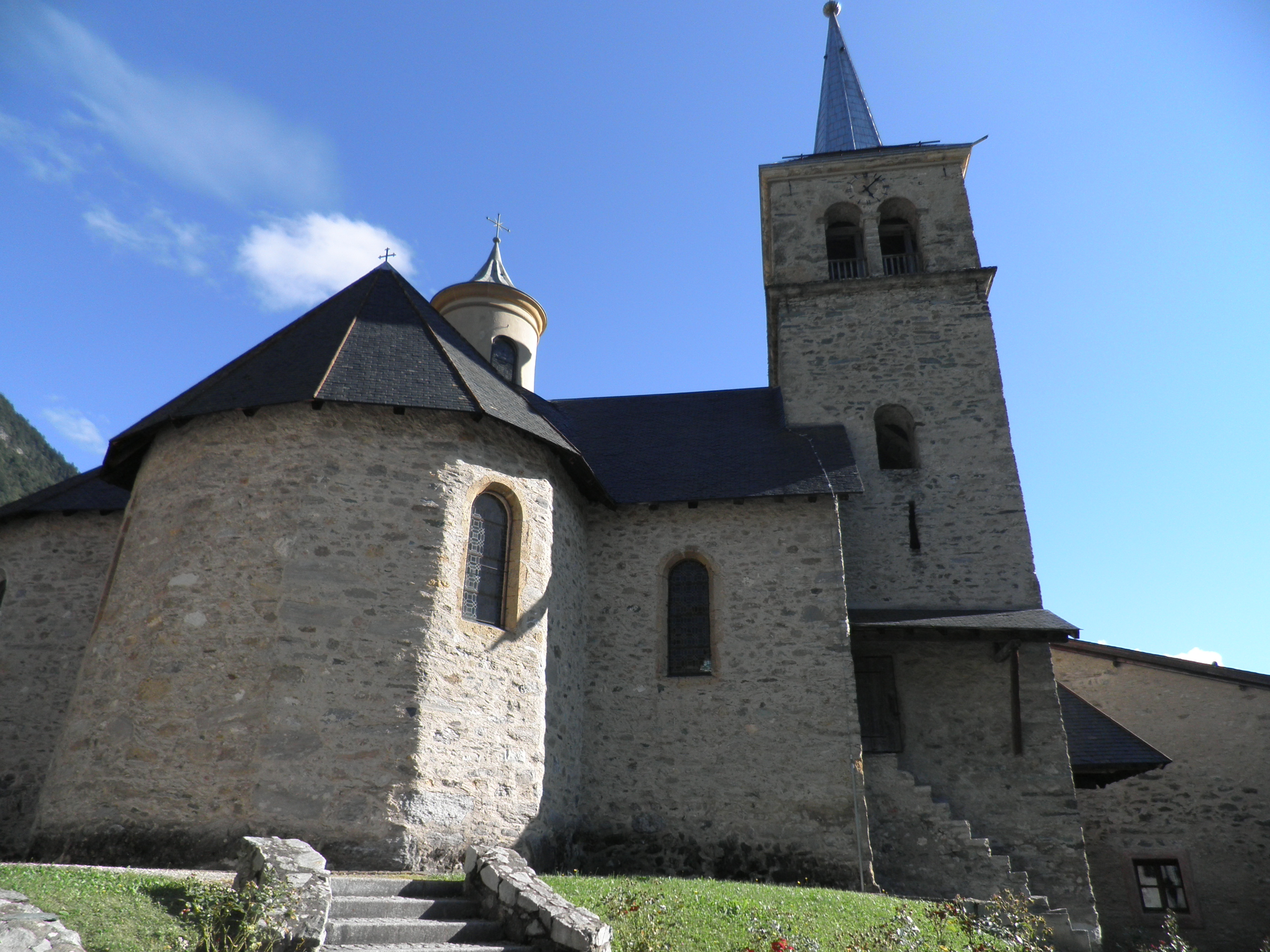
- The church in Villargerel

- Coat of arms
- Location of Aigueblanche
- Location within France Location within Auvergne-Rhône-Alpes
- Coordinates: 45°30′06″N 6°30′37″E
- Country: France
- Region: Auvergne-Rhône-Alpes
- Department: Savoie
- Arrondissement: Albertville
- Canton: Moûtiers
- Commune: Grand-Aigueblanche
- Area^{1}: 19.67 km^{2} (7.59 sq mi)
- Highest elevation: 2,280 m (7,480 ft)
- Lowest elevation: 437 m (1,434 ft)
- Population (2021): 3,208
  - Density: 163.1/km^{2} (422.4/sq mi)
- Time zone: UTC+01:00 (CET)
  - Summer (DST): UTC+02:00 (CEST)
- Postal code: 73260
- Website: www.aigueblanche.fr
- ^{1} French Land Register data, which excludes lakes, ponds, glaciers > 1 km^{2} (0.386 sq mi or 247 acres) and river estuaries.

Aigueblanche (French pronunciation: [ɛɡblɑ̃ʃ]; Savoyard: Èguablantse) is a former commune in the Savoie department in the Auvergne-Rhône-Alpes region in south-eastern France. In 1971 it absorbed the former communes Bellecombe-Tarentaise, Grand-Cœur and Villargerel. On 1 January 2019, it was merged into the new commune Grand-Aigueblanche.

== History ==
Peter of Aigueblanche (or Peter of Aquablanca; died 27 November 1268) was a medieval Bishop of Hereford. A nobleman from Savoy, he came to England as part of the party accompanying King Henry III's bride Eleanor of Provence. He entered the royal service, becoming bishop in 1241. He then served the king for a number of years as a diplomat, helping to arrange the marriage of Prince Edward. Peter became embroiled in King Henry's attempts to acquire the kingdom of Sicily, and Peter's efforts to raise money towards that goal brought condemnation from the clergy and barons of England. When the barons began to revolt against King Henry in the late 1250s and early 1260s, Peter was attacked and his lands and property pillaged. He was arrested briefly in 1263 by the barons, before being mostly restored to his lands after the Battle of Evesham.

== International relations ==
Aigueblanche is twinned with Villeneuve, Italy.

== Population ==
Historical population
Year	Pop.	±% p.a.
2006	2,926	—
2011	3,106	+1.20%
2015	3,155	+0.39%
2021	3,208	+0.28%
Source: INSEE

== See also ==
- Communes of the Savoie department
