= Arnfinn Graue =

Norwegian nuclear physicist (1926–2021)

Arnfinn Graue (October 1, 1926 - February 28, 2021) was a Norwegian nuclear physicist.

He was born in Bergen. He was appointed a docent at the University of Bergen from 1961, took the dr.philos. degree in 1966 and was promoted to professor in experimental nuclear physics in 1971. He served as dean of the Faculty of Natural Sciences from 1978 to 1980, vice rector from 1981 to 1983 and rector from 1984 to 1989. He was also a Norwegian delegate to CERN from 1984.

Academic offices
Preceded by	Dean of the Faculty of Natural Sciences, University of Bergen; 1978–1980	Succeeded by
Preceded by Ørjar Øyen	Rector of the University of Bergen; 1984–1989	Succeeded by Ole Didrik Lærum
