= M. Elizabeth Graue =

American academic

M. Elizabeth Graue is Sorenson professor of Curriculum and Instruction, in the School of Education at the University of Wisconsin–Madison. She is the former Associate Director for Faculty, Staff, and Student Development at the Wisconsin Center for Education Research. Graue's areas of interest include school readiness, class size reduction, preK policy, preparing teachers for inclusive home-school relations, and qualitative research methods.

She is part of a team of researchers developing and implementing developmentally and culturally responsive practices in early math and is collaborating with Sharon Ryan on a study of the translation of preK policy to children's experience.

== Awards and honors ==
- Outstanding mentor, Women's faculty mentoring, University of Wisconsin Madison
- American Educational Research Association Member at large.
- American Educational Research Association Fellow
- Vilas Associates Award, University of Wisconsin–Madison Graduate School, 2006-8, Outstanding reviewer, Educational Researcher , 2003, 2006
- American Educational Research Association Division D & Special Interest Group on Qualitative Research Outstanding Dissertation Using Qualitative Methodology, 1990;
- American Educational Research Association Early Education/Child Development Special Interest Group Outstanding Dissertation Award, 1990.

== Books ==
- Trainor, A. & Graue, M.E. (2013). Reviewing Qualitative Research in the Social Sciences . Routledge.
- Graue, M.E. & Walsh, Daniel J. (1998). Studying Children in Context: Theories, Methods, and Ethics. Thousand Oaks: Sage Publications (1998). ISBN 0-8039-7257-1
- Graue, M.E. (1993). Ready for What? Constructing Meanings of Readiness for Kindergarten. Albany, NY: State University of New York Press (1992). ISBN 0-7914-1204-0
