= Mosbytoppane =

Mountain on Bouvet Island

Coordinates: 54°26′S 3°21′E

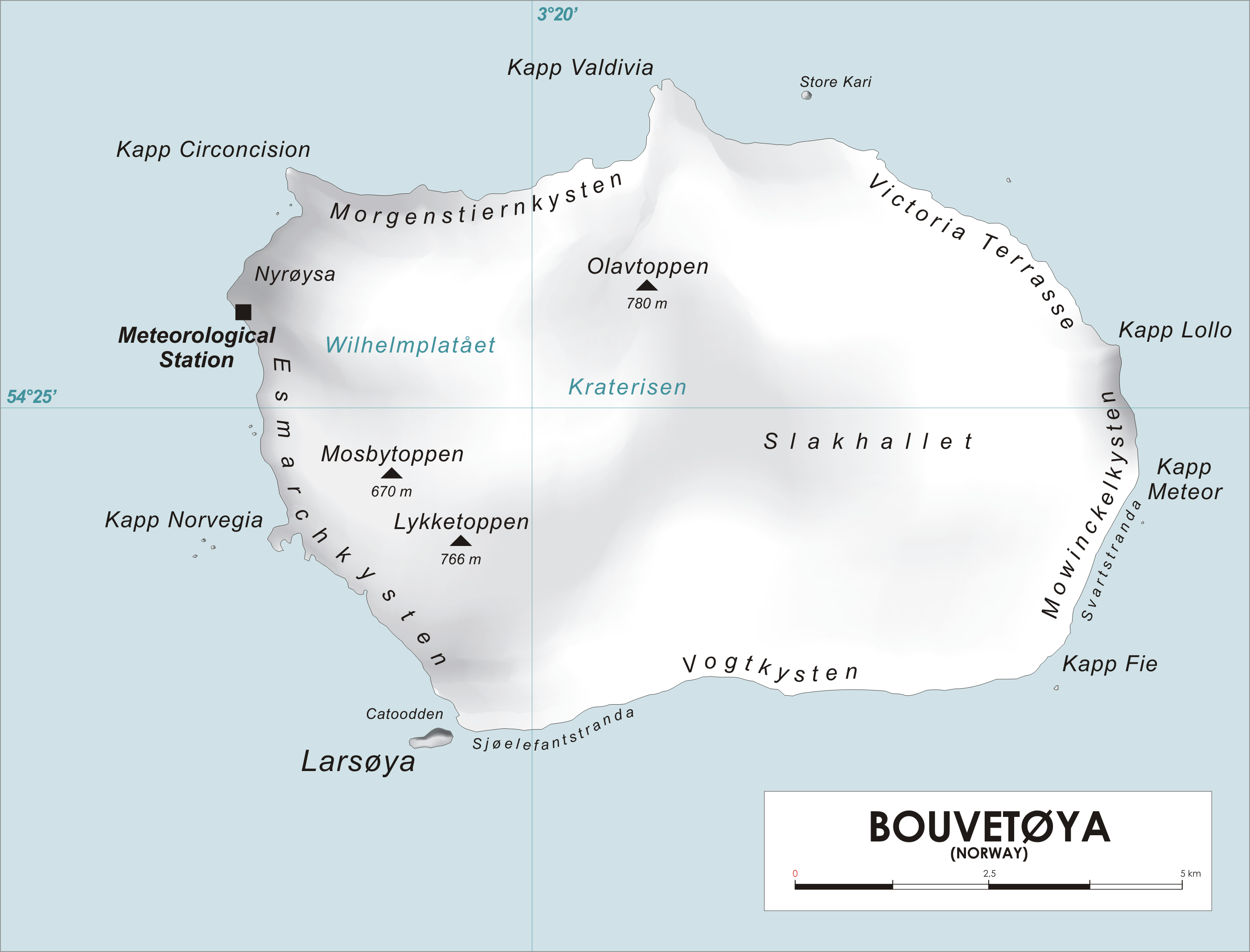
Map of Bouvetøya

Mosbytoppane (earlier Mosbytoppen, sometimes anglicized as Mosby Peak), are two crags to the southwest of the caldera of the island of Bouvetøya. The tallest is a snow-covered peak 670 meters (2,200 ft) above mean sea level and 1.3 kilometers (0.81 mi) northeast of Norvegiaodden. It was charted by the First Norvegia Expedition in 1927–28, under Captain Harald Horntvedt. It is named for Hakon Mosby, an oceanographer and meteorologist who was one of two scientists on the expedition.
