= William Y. Hutchinson =

American industrialist and philanthropist (1916–2006)

- Born: 4 September 1916
- Died: 4 December 2006 (aged 90)
- Spouse: Wyn Hutchinson

Education
- Education: University of Chicago

Philosophical work
- Era: 21st-century philosophy
- Region: Western philosophy

William Y. Hutchinson (4 September 1916 – 4 December 2006) was an American industrialist and philanthropist, and the chairman of the Board of the Continental Scale Corporation. He received a BA from Cornell University and an MBA from the University of Chicago. and also completed course work for a PhD in philosophy from Chicago. He later received an honorary Doctor of Humane Letters from Garrett-Evangelical Theological Seminary, where he was also chairman of the board. The Professorship in Ethics and Public Life at Cornell University is named after him and his wife, Wyn.
