= Moseby =

Moseby is a surname. It is an alternate spelling of Mosby. Notable people with the surname include:

- Lloyd Moseby (born 1959), a former Major League Baseball player
- Harry Moseby, an Australian Paralympic athlete
- Ulrik Moseby (born 1964), a Danish former association football player
- Mr. Moseby, a character on The Suite Life of Zack & Cody and its spin-off, The Suite Life on Deck
