= Håkon Mosby =

Norwegian oceanographer (1903–1989)

- Born: 10 July 1903; Kristiansand, Norway
- Died: 18 October 1989 (aged 86); Bergen
- Occupation: Oceanographer
- Awards: Order of St. Olav

Håkon Mosby (10 July 1903 – 18 October 1989) was a Norwegian oceanographer.

Mosby was born in Kristiansand to headmaster Salve Mosby and Mette Catrine Nodeland. He was appointed professor of physical oceanography at the University of Bergen from 1948, and served as rector from 1966 to 1971. He was a member of the Norwegian Academy of Science and Letters from 1948, and was decorated Commander of the Order of St. Olav in 1971.

== See also ==
- Mosby Glacier
- Mosbytoppane

Academic offices
Preceded by Ludvig Holm-Olsen	Rector of the University of Bergen; 1966–1971	Succeeded by Arne-Johan Henrichsen
