= Walnut Creek (Flat Creek tributary) =

Stream in the American state of Missouri

Coordinates: 38°38′59″N 93°09′39″W

Walnut Creek (also called Walnut Branch) is a tributary of Flat Creek in the U.S. state of Missouri, in Pettis County.

Walnut Creek was so named due to the walnut trees near its course.

== See also ==
- List of rivers of Missouri
