= Ethical Theory and Moral Practice =

- Discipline: Philosophy
- Language: English
- Edited by: A.W. Musschenga; F.R. Heeger

Publication details
- History: 1998-present
- Publisher: Springer Science+Business Media (Germany)
- Frequency: 5/year

Standard abbreviations
- ISO 4: Ethical Theory Moral Pract.

Indexing
- ISSN: 1386-2820 (print); 1572-8447 (web)
- JSTOR: 13862820
- OCLC no.: 474766479

Links
- Journal homepage

Ethical Theory and Moral Practice is a peer-reviewed academic journal in the field of philosophy, established in 1998 and published five times a year by Springer Science+Business Media. It publishes articles in English, focusing on ethics and related fields. It is edited by A. W. Musschenga and F. R. Heeger.

== Abstracting and indexing ==
The journal is indexed in the following services:

- Academic OneFile
- EBSCO Publishing
- Arts & Humanities Citation Index
- Current Contents
- European Reference Index for the Humanities
- FRANCIS
- Humanities Abstracts
- Humanities Index
- International Bibliography of the Social Sciences
- JSTOR
- OmniFile
- PASCAL
- Scopus
- Serials Solutions
- The Philosopher's Index
