= Saint-Oyen, Savoie =

Saint-Oyen Sint-Ouin (Savoyard)
- Part of Grand-Aigueblanche
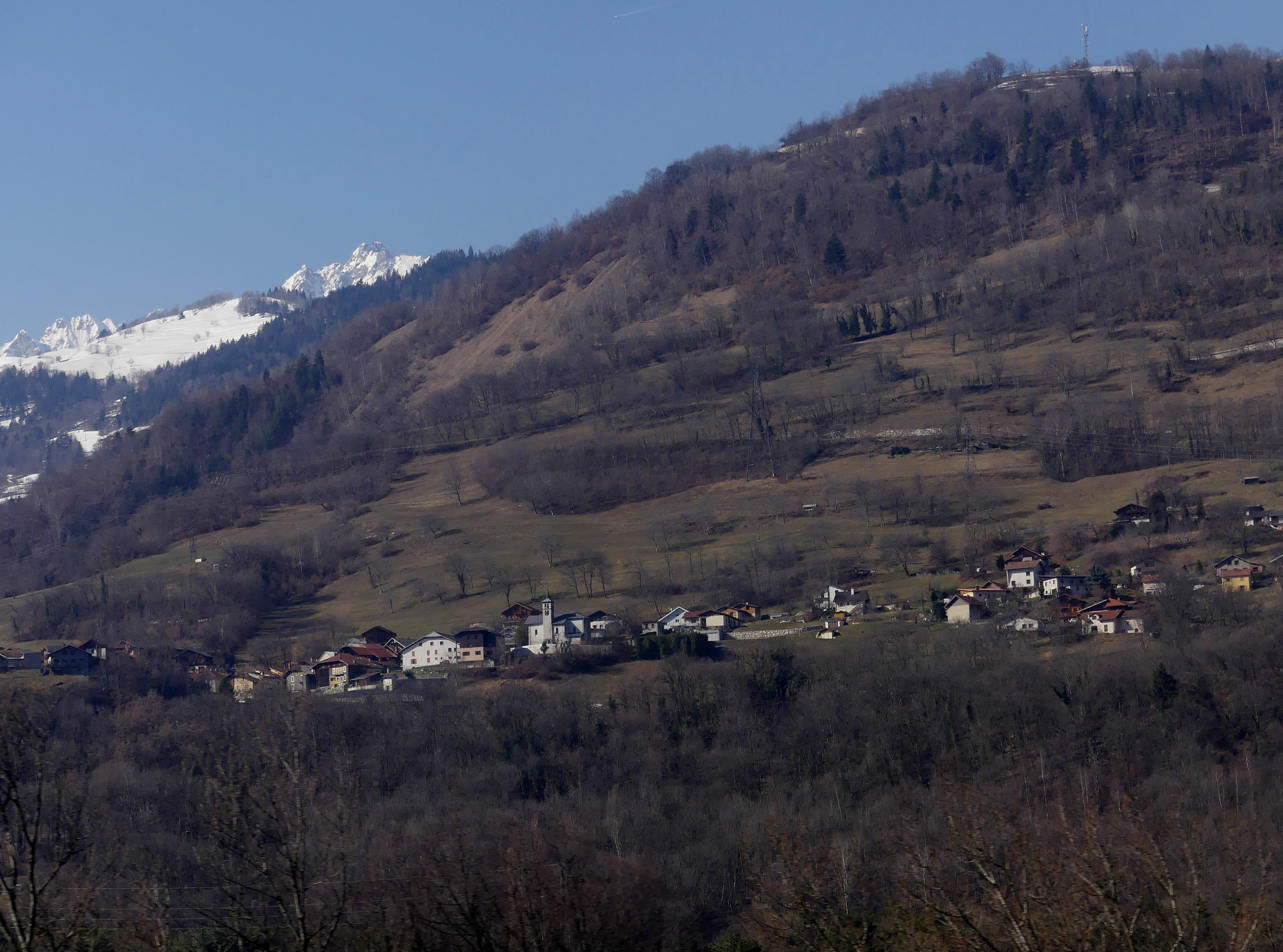
- Location of Saint-Oyen
- Location within France Location within Auvergne-Rhône-Alpes
- Coordinates: 45°30′16″N 6°29′05″E
- Country: France
- Region: Auvergne-Rhône-Alpes
- Department: Savoie
- Arrondissement: Albertville
- Canton: Moûtiers
- Commune: Grand-Aigueblanche
- Area^{1}: 2.11 km^{2} (0.81 sq mi)
- Elevation: 600 m (2,000 ft)
- Highest elevation: 1,102 m (3,615 ft)
- Lowest elevation: 509 m (1,670 ft)
- Population (2022): 195
  - Density: 92.4/km^{2} (239/sq mi)
- Time zone: UTC+01:00 (CET)
  - Summer (DST): UTC+02:00 (CEST)
- Postal code: 73260
- ^{1} French Land Register data, which excludes lakes, ponds, glaciers > 1 km^{2} (0.386 sq mi or 247 acres) and river estuaries.

Saint-Oyen (Savoyard: Sint-Ouin) is a former commune in the Savoie department in the Auvergne-Rhône-Alpes region in south-eastern France. On 1 January 2019, it was merged into the new commune Grand-Aigueblanche.

== Twin towns ==
The village is twinned with Saint-Oyens in Switzerland. Like its twin, the village is named after Saint Eugendus, a 6th century cleric.

== See also ==
- Communes of the Savoie department
