= Saint Michael's Academy, Spokane =

Saint Michael's Academy

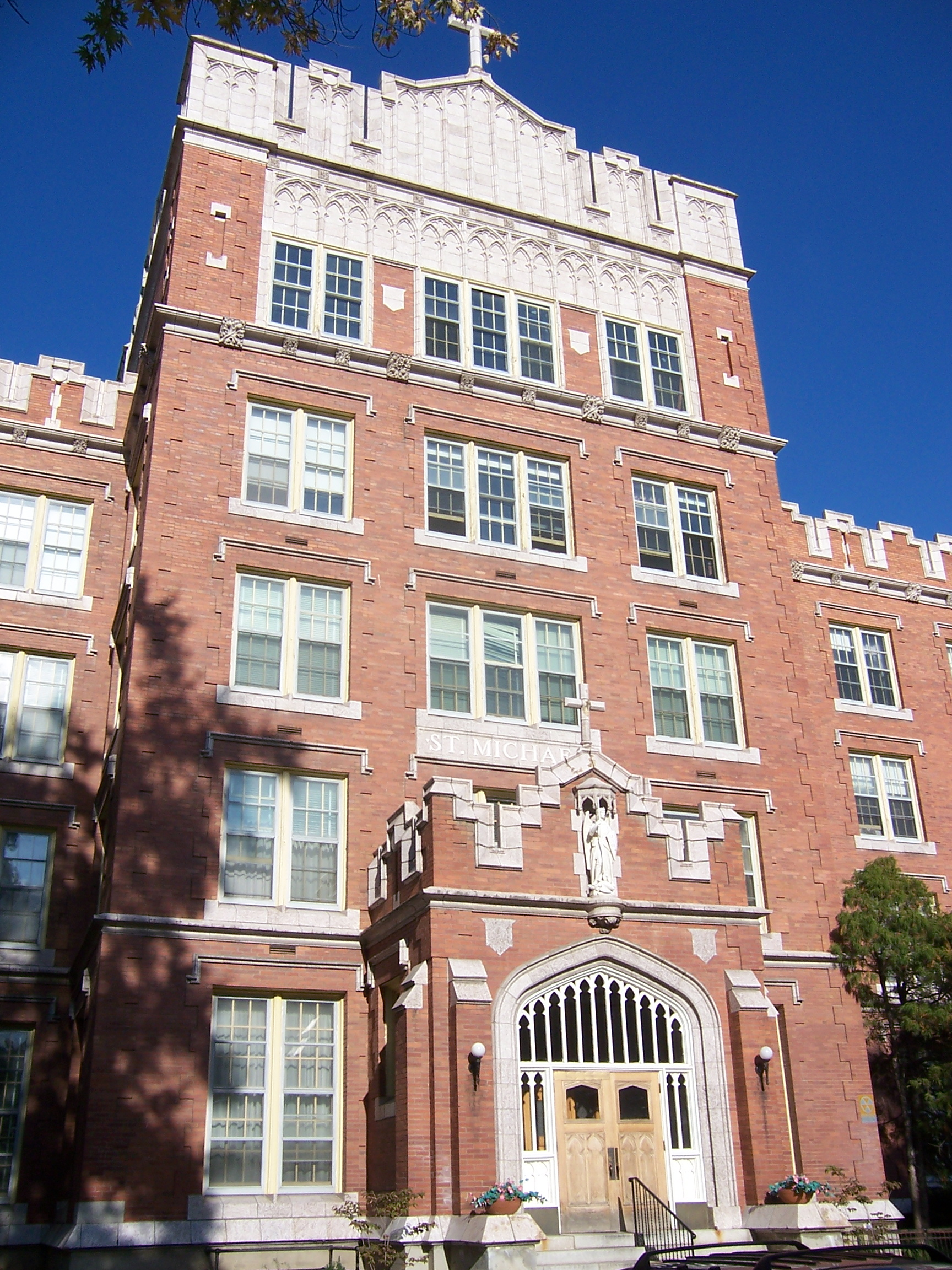

Location
- 8500 N Saint Michaels Road; Spokane, Washington, WA; United States
- Coordinates: 47.731471°N 117.341344°W

Information
- Type: Co-ed, Private, Boarding
- Motto: Maxima Puero Reverentia Debetur
- Religious affiliations: Traditionalist Catholic (sedevacantist)
- Established: 1968
- NCES School ID: A9106857
- Principal: Sister Michael Marie
- Faculty: 21
- Enrollment: 136 (2017-18)
- Average class size: 10
- Student to teacher ratio: 14:1
- Campus: 200 acres (81 ha)
- Colors: Silver, Navy Blue
- Athletics: baseball basketball softball crosscountry
- Mascot: Warrior
- Website: St. Michael's

Saint Michael's Academy is an American day school for boys and girls, and boarding school for girls, from kindergarten through twelfth grade located in Spokane, Washington, United States, and administered by the Congregation of Mary Immaculate Queen, a Sedevacantist Traditionalist Catholic religious congregation.

== History ==
St. Michael's Academy was founded in 1968 as Maria Regina Academy by Francis Schuckardt, a leader in the Blue Army of Our Lady of Fatima in northern Idaho as a group of four schools, a high school each for boys and girls and a grade school each for boys and girls.

In September 1978, the boys high school moved to Mount Saint Michael in Spokane, Washington, its present home.

In 1996 the individual schools within Maria Regina Academy, Holy Angels Elementary School, Immaculata High School for girls and St. Michael's High School for boys, were united into a single school called Saint Michael's Academy.
