= Joaquín Sáenz y Arriaga =

Mexican sedevacantist priest and theologian (1899–1976)

The Reverend Joaquín Sáenz y Arriaga
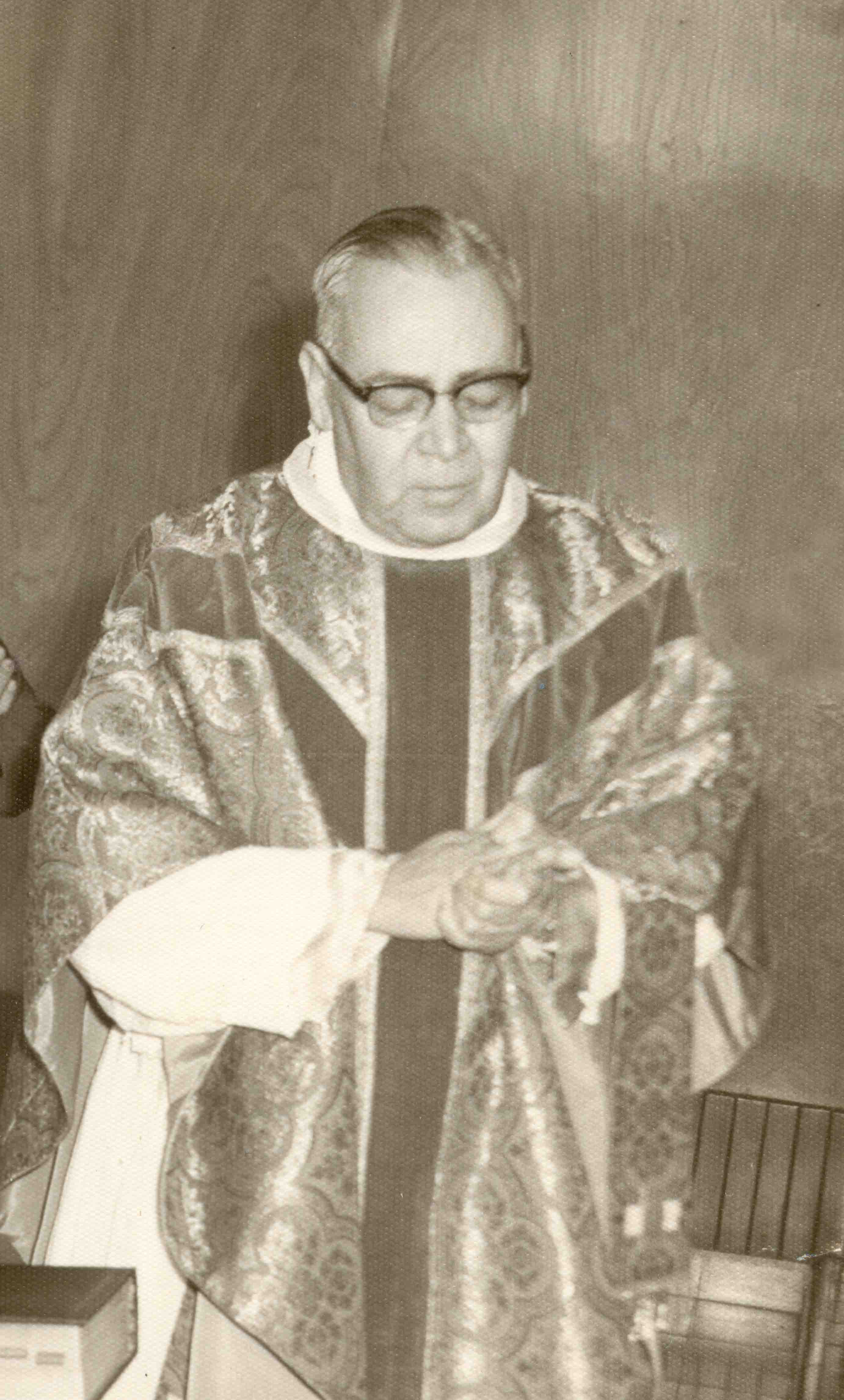
- Sáenz in 1966

Orders
- Ordination: 30 April 1930 by Francisco Orozco y Jiménez, Archbishop of Guadalajara

Personal details
- Born: 12 October 1899 Morelia, Michoacán, Mexico
- Died: 28 April 1976 (aged 76) Mexico City, Mexico
- Buried: Panteón Francés de la Piedad
- Parents: Rafael Sáenz y Arriaga & Magdalena Arriaga Burgos de Sáenz
- Profession: Priest; Theologian; writer; theologian
- Education: Theology, philosophy, canon law
- Alma mater: Pontifical Gregorian University

Joaquín Sáenz y Arriaga (12 October 1899 – 28 April 1976) was a Mexican Jesuit priest and theologian who was excommunicated from the Catholic Church. He played a significant role in contemporary traditionalist Catholicism, both in Mexico and in the wider Catholic world, as a pioneering theorist of sedevacantism, claiming that Pope Paul VI was a heretical antipope and thus not legitimate. His two most prominent works, The New Montinian Church (1971) and Sede Vacante (1973) have been described as "foundational" in the development of sedevacantism.

Having been formed as a Jesuit during the Cristero War in the aftermath of the Mexican Revolution and state persecution of the Catholic Church in Mexico, Sáenz y Arriaga closely involved himself in the struggle for Catholic education in Mexico. This brought him into close association with the secret society Los TECOS, associated with the Universidad Autónoma de Guadalajara from the 1930s onward. He served as spiritual advisor to the group, endorsed integralism, and was staunchly anti-communist, supporting a so-called "Christian order" against an alleged "Judeo-Masonic conspiracy."

Sáenz y Arriaga lobbied at the Second Vatican Council against the development of the document Nostra aetate, which dealt with relations between the Catholic Church and the Jews. In the aftermath of the council, he opposed the pioneers of Latin American liberation theology, particularly Sergio Méndez Arceo, the Bishop of Cuernavaca and leader of the Centro Intercultural de Documentación. He also opposed the Second Conference of the Latin American and Caribbean Episcopal Council at Medellín, which he attended.

In the later years of his life, Sáenz y Arriaga was more publicly critical of Paul VI, finally declaring him in published works a heretical and non-Catholic antipope, for which he was excommunicated by Cardinal Miguel Darío Miranda y Gómez, the Archbishop of Mexico City, in 1971. In liturgy, he completely rejected the New Mass and continued to celebrate the Tridentine liturgy. His publication, Trento, which he operated with Fr Moisés Carmona, became the basis of the Unión Católica Trento and organised sedevacantism in Mexico and later internationally.

== Early life ==
Joaquín Sáenz y Arriaga was born on 12 October 1899 to Rafael Sáenz Arciga (born 1863) and Magdalena Arriaga Burgos de Sáenz (born 1862) in Morelia, Michoacán, Mexico. His parents were both of Spanish ancestry and Old Christian heritage. Part of a large Catholic family, Joaquín was the tenth child of thirteen. The brother of his grandmother was José Ignacio Arciga, Metropolitan Archbishop of Michoacán in the mid-19th century.

As a child, Joaquín showed an interest in a priestly vocation from a young age. At the age of ten in his Morelia home, he had a small altar erected where he would "play priest" with his brothers Luis and Pablo, who would "serve" as his acolytes during simulations of the Holy Sacrifice of the Mass. This included sermons to his brothers and friends. His religious piety and knowledge of Catholic doctrine was influenced greatly by his mother. For school, he attended the Scientific Institute of the Sacred Heart of Jesus ran by Institute of the Brothers of the Christian Schools and achieved a diploma.

== Society of Jesus ==
Intending to join the Carthusians as a teenager, as he was drawn to the life of quiet contemplation, he was convinced instead by the local ordinary Leopoldo Ruiz y Flóres, the Archbishop of Michoacán, that his talents were more suited as a "soldier for Christ" in the Society of Jesus. He set sail to Spain in 1916 and after visiting the Sanctuary of Loyola at the birthplace of St. Ignatius of Loyola, he entered the Jesuit seminary at Santander. His brother Luis Sáenz y Arriaga had been ordained a priest in 1911 after having studied at the Pontifical Latin American College (though he died in 1917 after contracting typhus while aiding needy patients).

As was usual for a Jesuit seminarian, he moved around to different cities in Spain, spending the years from 1918 to 1922 in Granada, Andalusia. Here he studied Literature, Humanities and Philosophy. While in Granada he made his perpetual vows of poverty, obedience and chastity in the Society of Jesus on 16 September 1918. He moved again in 1923 to Sarrià, Barcelona, Catalonia attending the St. Ignatius College, Barcelona, where he studied Rhetoric and continued his studies in Philosophy.

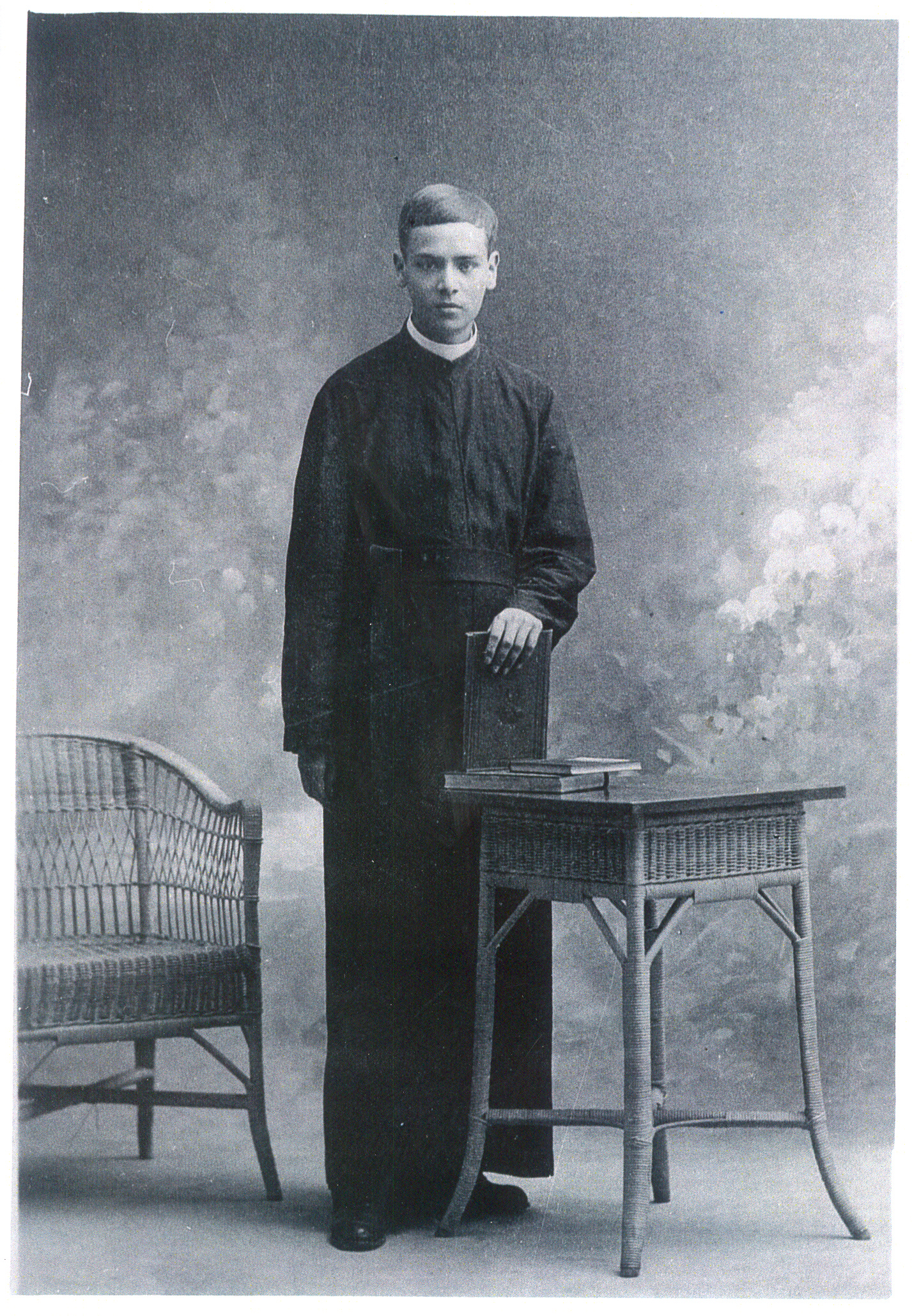
Sáenz as a young seminarian in Barcelona, Spain, 1923

Along with another seminarian, José Bravo, he was sent to Granada, Nicaragua, where he was assigned to teach at the Central American School of the Sacred Heart of Jesus, where he taught primary school children, as well as assisting the perfect (a role he would eventually fill). He was in Nicaragua from 1924 until early March 1926, where he was sent to visit the Jesuit seminary at La Libertad, El Salvador, as he had a growing reputation for his intellectual prowess. However, a personality clash with the Father Superior of the Jesuit seminary in El Salvador saw him continue on to his home nation of Mexico at Puebla. He would return to Spain to complete his studies in theology at the St. Ignatius College, Barcelona. He was visited by Mexicans here, such as future politician Miguel Estrada Iturbide and was kept informed of the difficulties of the Catholic Church in Mexico due to rising government persecution.

For his second and third years of Theology studies, in 1927 he was sent to the Jesuit seminary of Woodstock College in Woodstock, Maryland, a suburb of Baltimore, in the United States. Here he earned diplomas in Theology, Philosophy and Canon law, which bore the signatures of the Superior General of the Society of Jesus (Wlodimir Ledóchowski) and the Rector of the Pontifical Gregorian University (Giuseppe Gianfranceschi). Back in his homeland of Mexico at this time the situation had radicalised for Catholics with the ascent to power of Plutarco Elías Calles, an anticlerical Freemason, who had brought in the so-called Calles Law which targeted Catholicism; a rebellion against these anticlerical and secularist measures known as the Cristero War was taking place. Sáenz y Arriaga attempted to aid the Cristeros by lobbying ecclesiastical authorities in the United States, relaying news and information from his peer on the ground Leopoldo Lara y Torres, the Bishop of Tacámbaro. With an official end to the militant aspect of the rebellion, Mexican religious living abroad were permitted to return home and so Sáenz y Arriaga returned to Mexico in July 1929 having completed his studies.

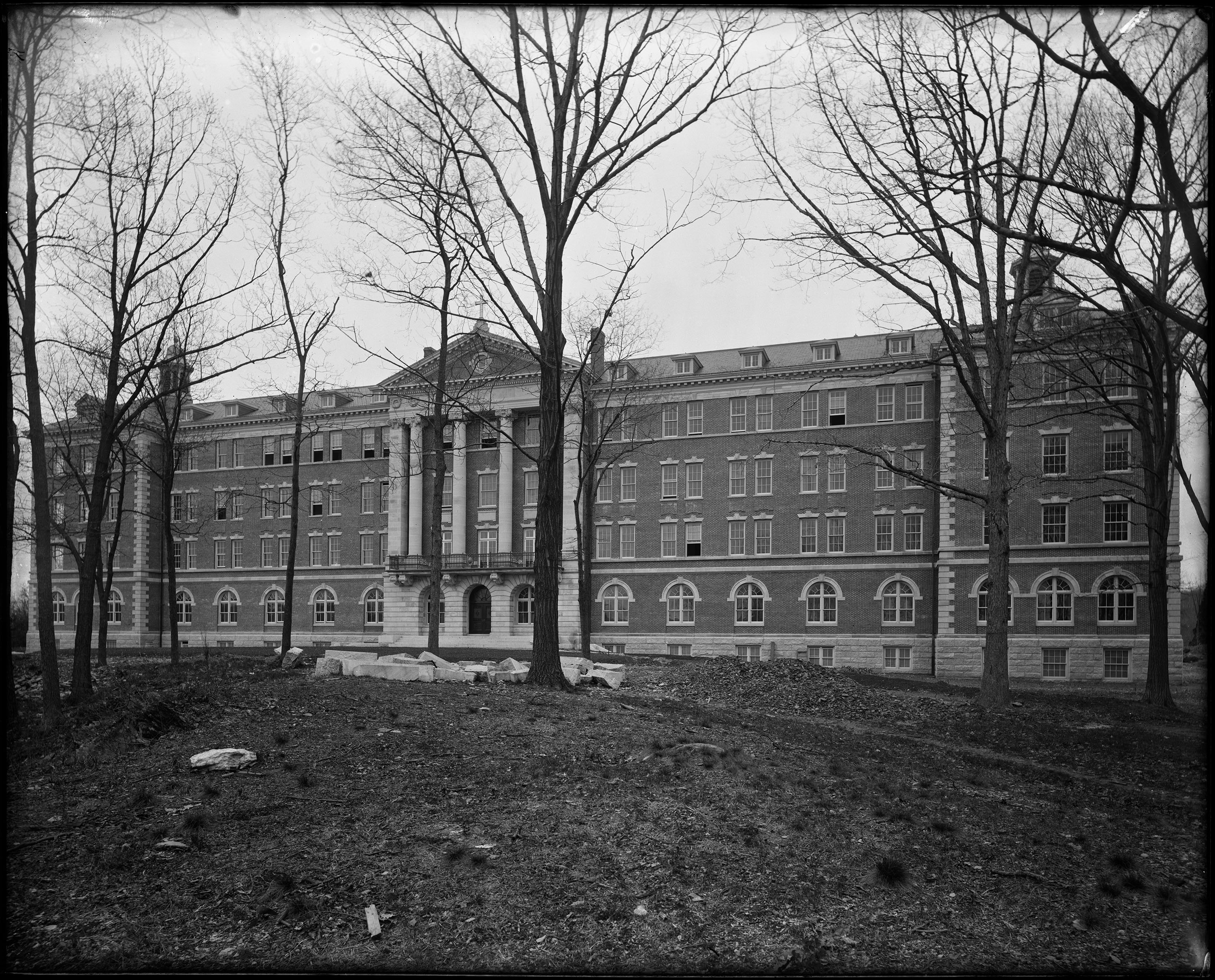
The Jesuit St. Andrew-on-Hudson Novitiate, Poughkeepsie, New York. Sáenz y Arriaga taught Ignatian spiritual exercises here in the early 1930s.

Upon his return to Mexico, he was assigned to teach English at the Colegio de San José in Guadalajara, Jalisco. It was while living in this city, that he was ordained to the priesthood of the Roman Catholic Church on 30 April 1930 at the Church of St. Philip of Jesus. He was ordained by the local ordinary, Francisco Orozco y Jiménez, Archbishop of Guadalajara and the apostolic witness was his old friend Leopoldo Lara y Torres, Bishop of Tacámbaro. His uncle, Canon Rafael Sáenz Arciga, was also in attendance. At the same church, he celebrated his first public Holy Mass on 2 May 1930.

Soon after, he returned to the United States for two years, completing a fourth year of Theology study at the Woodstock College, Maryland before moving on to Poughkeepsie, New York, at the St. Andrew-on-Hudson Novitiate, where he delivered Ignatian spiritual exercises. While in New York, he also visited Columbia University, becoming familiar with Fr. George Barry Ford, an American Catholic priest and chaplain to the Newman Club there. During this time, the Americans were beginning to experiment with ecumenism and Ford's connections brought Sáenz y Arriaga into discussions with representatives of the Union Theological Seminary. This left him with a distinctly negative perception of Protestantism and a belief that it played merely a polite social function in American life rather than being based on genuine belief in the divinity of Jesus Christ.

== Second Vatican Council and aftermath ==
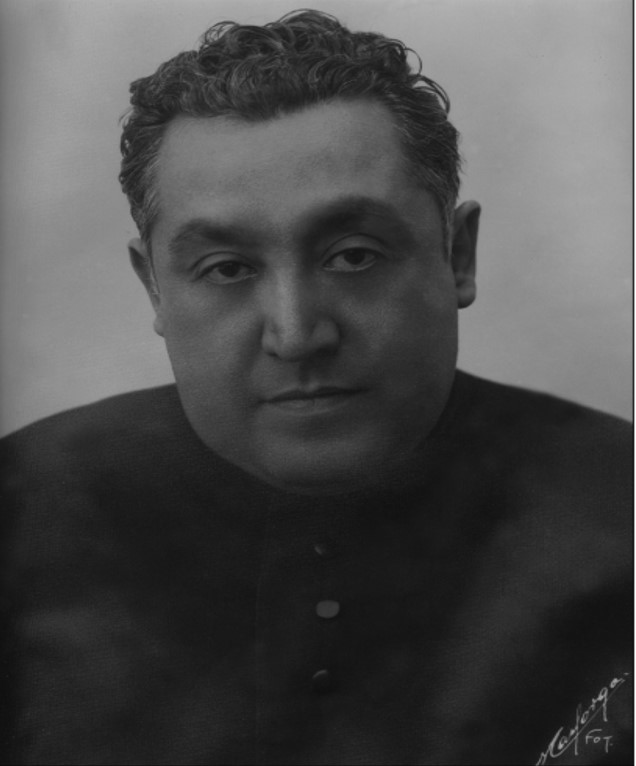
Sáenz y Arriaga accompanied Fr. Rafael Rúa y Álvarez to Rome during the Second Vatican Council, lobbying for the traditionalist cause.

During the Second Vatican Council, convoked in 1962, in the early sessions it became clear that the liberal contingent were gaining the upper-hand, much to the dismay of Sáenz y Arriaga and his associates in Los TECOS. He visited Rome during the council, along with Fr. Rafael Rúa y Álvarez, another Mexican priest. In October 1962, a highly controversial document entitled Il Complotto contro la Chiesa ("The Plot Against the Church") under the pseudonym of Maurice Pinay was anonymously distributed to all attending. This work pushed back against the development of Nostra aetate (a document on the relationship between the Catholic Church and the Jews) and posited a wide-ranging conspiracy theory, in which it claimed that Judaism had worked to overthrow Christianity and the Catholic Church ever since its inception and claimed that the "Synagogue of Satan" had been behind every major heresy, as well as encouraging "enemies" such as Freemasonry and Communism. Some speculated that Sáenz y Arriaga was the author of the polemic and associate its spread at the council to him, but Scott Anderson and Jon Lee Anderson have claimed that the actual authors were his fellow members of Los TECOS; Carlos Cuesta Gallardo and Garibi Velasco.

While in Europe, Fr. Sáenz y Arriaga published in July 1963, just after the death of Pope John XXIII (Angelo Roncalli), a work entitled Carta de informacíon a los obispos de España, Portugal y América (“Letter of Information to the Bishops of Spain, Portugal and America”), in which he sought to sound the alarm of “dangers” at the council, seeking to rally conservative leaning bishops in Spain, Portugal and Latin America to the traditionalist cause. The work openly criticised the recently deceased John XXIII; while not claiming that he had been an Antipope, it claimed that while nuncio in Paris he was a friend of high ranking Masonic dignitaries and that during the Second World War in Turkey and Bulgaria, he had forged baptismal certificates for Jews who had not actually converted to the Catholic faith. Sáenz y Arriaga and Rúa y Álvarez made contacts with the conservative Cardinal Antonio Samorè and from the outside, encouraged members of the Coetus Internationalis Patrum at the council, not least Cardinal Alfredo Ottaviani, Archbishop Marcel Lefebvre, Archbishop Geraldo de Proença Sigaud, Bishop Luigi Maria Carli and the Eastern Catholic patriarchs. During this time Sáenz y Arriaga and Rúa y Álvarez also visited Spain and met with the Spanish Head of State, Francisco Franco, seeking support of the Caudillo for Mexican Catholics.

During the 1963 conclave, Fr. Sáenz y Arriaga along with some laymen and influenced by the views of Argentine Jesuit, Fr. Julio Meinvielle, sent out a dossier to participating Cardinals, providing supposed evidence of Cardinal Giovanni Montini’s alleged neo-modernism, as he emerged as the compromise candidate between the liberals and the moderates. In addition to this, Sáenz y Arriaga travelled to Paris to visit Msgr. Georges Roche, one of the secretaries of Cardinal Eugène Tisserant, to gather intelligence on Montini, as Pope Pius XII had previously commissioned Roche to monitor Montini, then Pro-Secretary of State, for “suspicious relationships.” Regardless, the conservative forces were outmanoeuvered in the conclave and Montini was elected Pope Paul VI. The good relations Sáenz y Arriaga had made with Eastern Catholic patriarchs over mutual interests in the struggles at the council, particularly Christians in the Arab world, saw him take a pilgrimage to the Holy Land around this time as well and on 31 July 1965, he was awarded the title of honorable citizen of Bethlehem, by Elias Bandak, the Palestinian Christian who was then the sitting Mayor of Bethlehem.

In the aftermath of the council, upon returning to Mexico, Sáenz y Arriaga authored a book called Con Cristo o contra Cristo ("With Christ or Against Christ") against the document from the Second Vatican Council which he had fought most vehemently against; Nostra aetate. The work started with a translation of an article by Joseph Roddy, an American journalist for Look magazine, who in 1966 had published an article entitled “How the Jews Changed Catholic Thinking”, in relation to the history of the document. It alleged direct involvement of the American Jewish Committee, the ADL of B’nai B’rith and the World Jewish Congress with Cardinal Augustin Bea’s SPCU in developing the document. This work greatly irritated the local ordinary Miguel Darío Miranda y Gómez, the Archbishop of Mexico City, and earned him a reprimand, however, it proved difficult to sanction Sáenz y Arriaga for this as it carried an official imprimatur from Juan María Navarrette y Guerrero, the Archbishop of Hermosillo. By the summer of 1967, tensions with the local Archbishop had thawed, as he was given permission to continue as the ordinary confessor to the Congregation of Perpetual Adoration of the Blessed Sacrament, upon the request of the Mother Superior.

== CIDOC, CELAM & liberation theology conflict ==
During the year of 1968, Sáenz y Arriaga toured South America holding several meetings with prominent traditionalists, such as Bishop Antônio de Castro Mayer of Campos in Brazil, Bishop Antonio Corso of Maldonado-Punta del Este-Minas in Uruguay and one of the pioneering theorists of sedevacantism, Carlos Alberto Disandro from Argentina. It was in this year that the Catholic factions in Latin America — represented at the radical ends by traditionalist Catholicism on one side and Latin American liberation theology on the other — were becoming increasingly polarised and as a consequence Sáenz y Arriaga was becoming increasingly open and direct in his published criticisms of the Vatican and its institutions, accusing them of complicity with communism.

== Excommunication and Sedevacantism ==
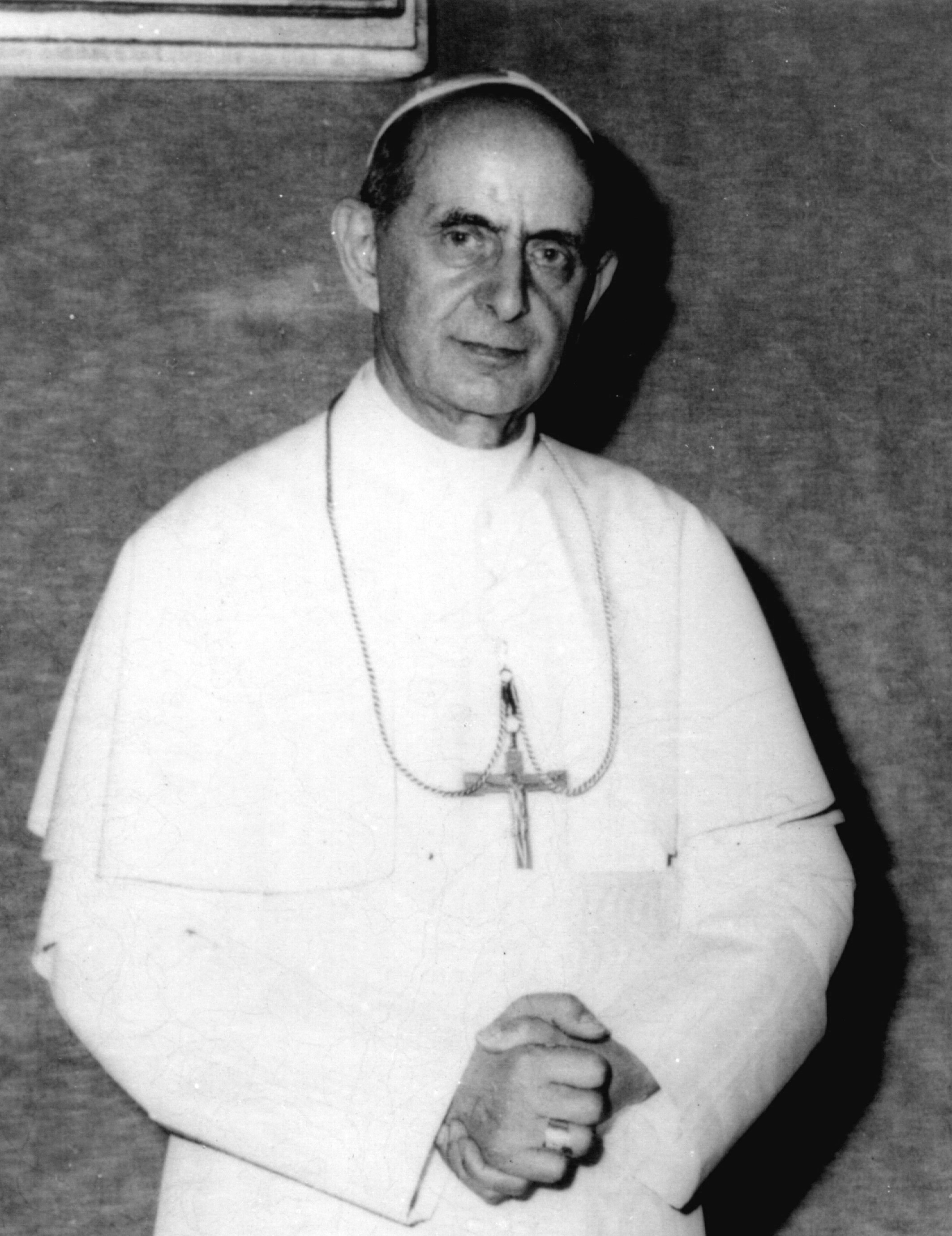
Sáenz y Arriaga was a founding figure of sedevacantism, authoring two works criticising Paul VI (Giovanni Montini), claiming that he was a heretical non-Catholic Antipope.

In 1971, Sáenz y Arriaga published a work entitled La nueva iglesia montiniana ("The New Montinian Church"), in which he argued that Paul VI (Giovanni Montini) was an illegitimate Pope and crypto-Jew who had the goal of creating a new Kabbalistic “homocentric religion of universal brotherhood” in place of the Catholic Church. This book directly led to Cardinal Miguel Darío Miranda y Gómez declaring Fr. Sáenz y Arriaga's suspension a divinis in December 1971 for "disobedience to the Pope." Debate swirled as to whether this amounted to excommunication or not. His supporters in Mexico (including members of Los TECOS) attacked the house of the Cardinal in Mexico City with graffiti saying “Sáenz sí, Miranda no.” Similarly in Rome, the cardinal's coat of arms was attacked by Italian integrists. His protegé and associate, Fr. Moisés Carmona from Acapulco, wrote:

They excommunicated you for your fidelity to Christ, His teachings and His Church. Blessed excommunication! As long as it is for this reason, may all [such] excommunications come upon me! (Note: "A usted lo excomulgaron por su fidelidad a Cristo, a sus enseñanzas, a su iglesia. ¡Bendita excomunión! Como sea por eso, que me vengan todas las excomuniones")

Following his excommunication, Sáenz y Arriaga released a book which developed the sedevacantist thesis in more depth and explicitly stated the case that Paul VI (Giovanni Montini) was not legitimately the Pope of the Catholic Church. This 1973 text, Sede Vacante: Paolo VI no es Papa legítimo ("Sede Vacante: Paul VI is Not a Legitimate Pope"), has been called “a foundational book for the new traditionalism”, with another book on the opposite progressivist end of the Church, Gustavo Gutiérrez’s A Theology of Liberation also having emerged from Latin America at the same time. According to the Oxford Handbook of Vatican II, speaking of The New Montinian Church and Sede Vacante, it states “these two books would play a part in the development of sedevacantism, which started in Mexico, spread to the United States and Spain, and reached France.” Along with the Frenchman, Fr. Michel-Louis Guérard des Lauriers, Sáenz y Arriaga was thus one of the leading theoreticians of sedevacantism at its inception.

In the 1970s, Sáenz, together with Carmona and Father Adolfo Zamora, founded the Unión Católica Trento (Tridentine Catholic Union).

== Legacy ==
In his last testament, written on 25 April 1976, Sáenz wrote:

My life and all that is most precious to me I have sacrificed for Christ, for the Church, and for the Papacy [...]. (Note: "Mi vida y todo lo más precioso que ella pudiera tener para mí la he sacrificado por Cristo, por la Iglesia y por el Papado [...].")

and he added:

May the last cry of my soul be that of our Mexican martyrs: Long live Christ the King, Long live the Virgin of Guadalupe! (Note: "Que el último suspiro de mi alma sea el de nuestros Mártires mexicanos: Viva Cristo Rey, Viva la Virgen de Guadalupe!")

He died of prostate cancer on 28 April 1976.

During the latter part of his life, Sáenz y Arriaga had stood as the de facto leader of sedevacantism in Mexico. His close collaborator with the journal Trento, Fr. Moisés Carmona, succeeded him after his death, with the founding of the Unión Católica Trento (“Tridentine Catholic Union”) in January 1977, heavily supervised by the secret society Los TECOS. Coupled with the consecration in October 1981 as Bishops of Fr. Moisés Carmona and Fr. Adolfo Zamora by Ngô Đình Thục, Titular Archbishop of Bulla Regia, a Vietnamese clergyman of the Roman Catholic Church, giving the Unión Católica Trento the ability to confer holy orders, including to ordain priests and consecrate Bishops, the Mexican sedevacantist movement initiated by Sáenz y Arriaga developed a more organised and institutionalised form than it had during his lifetime.

The Mexican sedevacantist movement founded by Sáenz y Arriaga fractured in the early 1990s, following the death of Bishop Carmona in a car crash, as well as conflicts between Los TECOS and the SSPX, which in turn led to conflicts between Los TECOS and Bishop José de Jesús Roberto Martínez y Gutiérrez (1917–2008), one of the priests consecrated by Carmona. As a consequence, the Unión Católica Trento transformed into the Sociedad Sacerdotal Trento ("Tridentine Priesty Society") in 1993, under Martín Dávila Gándara, as well as this the Fundación San Vicente Ferrer and the Obra Mariana Carmelitana also emerged. Many of these groups developed good relations with Mark Pivarunas and the Congregation of Mary Immaculate Queen (CMRI) in the United States, which had developed in the mid-1980s as the CMRI had cut ties with Francis Schuckardt. Pivarunas had been consecrated in 1991 by Carmona, who in turn consecrated Martín Dávila Gándara of the Sociedad Sacerdotal Trento in 1999.

== Works ==
- 1963: Carta de informacíon a los obispos de España, Portugal y América (“Letter of Information to the Bishops of Spain, Portugal and America”)
- 1966: Con Cristo o contra Cristo ("With Christ or Against Christ")
- 1967: Cuernavaca y el progresimo religioso en México ("Cuernavaca and Religious Progressivism in Mexico")
- 1971: La nueva iglesia montiniana ("The New Montinian Church")
- 1972: ¿Por qué me Excomulgaron?: ¿Cisma o Fe? ("Why Was I Excommunicated?: Schism or Faith?")
- 1973: Sede Vacante: Paolo VI no es Papa legítimo ("Sede Vacante: Paul VI is Not a Legitimate Pope")
