= Sisters of Mary, Mother of the Church =

Roman Catholic religious order

The Sisters of Mary, Mother of the Church is a Roman Catholic religious public association of the faithful in the Diocese of Spokane in Washington.

The group was formed by 15 nuns from Mount Saint Michael, who were expelled from the Congregation of Mary Immaculate Queen in June 2007 after they no longer accepted the congregation's Sedevacantist position. The small group was approved in 2008 by William Skylstad, Bishop of Spokane, after they re-entered into communion with the Church.
