= Bishop Dolan =

Bishop Dolan may refer to:

- Timothy Dolan, Roman Catholic Archbishop of New York
- Daniel Dolan, sedevacantist traditionalist Catholic bishop
- John P. Dolan, Roman Catholic Bishop of Phoenix
