= Moisés Carmona =

Traditionalist Catholic bishop (1912–1991)

Moisés Carmona Rivera
- Church: Iglesia Divina Providencia (Divine Providence Church), Acapulco, Guerrero, Mexico

Orders
- Ordination: November 1939 by Leopoldo Díaz y Escudero
- Consecration: 17 October 1981 by Pierre Martin Ngô Đình Thục

Personal details
- Born: Moisés Carmona y Rivera; 31 October 1912 Quechultenango, Guerrero, Mexico
- Died: 1 November 1991 (aged 79) Mexico
- Denomination: Sedevacantist Catholic

Ordination history of Moisés Carmona
History
Priestly ordination
- Ordained by: Leopoldo Díaz y Escudero
Episcopal consecration
- Consecrated by: Pierre Martin Ngô Đình Thục
Episcopal succession
Bishops consecrated by Moisés Carmona as principal consecrator
- George Musey: 1 April 1982
- Benigno Bravo: 18 June 1982
- Roberto Martínez y Gutiérrez: 18 June 1982
- Mark Pivarunas, CMRI: 24 September 1991

Moisés Carmona Rivera (31 October 1912 – 1 November 1991) was a Mexican Catholic priest from Acapulco, Guerrero, who as the leader of the Unión Católica Trento (“Tridentine Catholic Union”) became a sedevacantist traditionalist Catholic bishop. He was declared excommunicated by the pro-Vatican Metropolitan Archbishop of Acapulco in 1980. His consecration as a bishop was carried out in 1981 by Vietnamese clergyman, Archbishop Ngô Đình Thục, without the permission of the Vatican.

== Biography ==
In November 1939, Carmona was ordained a priest of the Roman Catholic Church by Leopoldo Díaz y Escudero, Bishop of Chilpancingo-Chilapa. Carmona became a seminary professor.

In the aftermath of the liberalising changes in the Catholic world following the Second Vatican Council, in the 1970s, Carmona became a strong supporter of the Mexican former Jesuit priest and pioneer of sedevacantism, Joaquín Sáenz y Arriaga. With him, he was involved in creating the journal Trento, through which traditionalist and sedevacantist ideas were promoted. After the death of Sáenz y Arriaga, Carmona became the de facto leader of Mexican sedevacantism and founded the Unión Católica Trento (“Tridentine Catholic Union”) in January 1977, along with Fr. Adolfo Zamora Cruz, heavily supervised by the Mexican integrist secret society Los TECOS.

On 30 April 1980, Rafael Bello Ruiz, the Vatican's Metropolitan Archbishop of Acapulco, issued a statement claiming to excommunicate Moisés Carmona from the Roman Catholic Church.

In 1981, Carmona and Zamora were brought by the German sedevacantists Dr Eberhard Heller and Dr Kurt Hiller to the Vietnamese sedevacantist bishop Ngô Đình Thục in Toulon, France. Thục consecrated them bishops in Toulon on 17 October 1981, which led to his excommunication.

Carmona went on to consecrate four more bishops: Mexicans Benigno Bravo and Roberto Martinez y Gutiérrez, and Americans George Musey and Mark Pivarunas.

Carmona died on 1 November 1991, one day after his 79th birthday, from injuries sustained in an automobile accident.

In 1996, Carmona's body was exhumed and transferred by Martín Dávila Gandara of the SST to a crypt in a lower chapel below the Divine Providence Church. Gandara claimed that during the transference, Carmona's body showed no signs of decomposition, and that pictures taken of him when his body was put into the crypt looked the same at the time of his funeral.
