= Mark Pivarunas =

American Catholic sedevacantist bishop

Mark Pivarunas CMRI
- Superior General of the Congregation of Mary Immaculate Queen
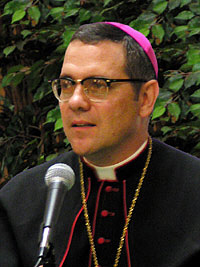
- Elected: 1989 (first term); 1995
- Term ended: 1991 (first term)
- Predecessor: Denis Chicoine (first term); Casimir Puskorius
- Successor: Casimir Puskorius (first term)

Orders
- Ordination: 27 June 1985 by George Musey
- Consecration: 24 September 1991 by Moisés Carmona

Personal details
- Born: 31 October 1958 (age 68) Chicago, Illinois, U.S.
- Denomination: Sedevacantist Catholic
- Residence: Mater Dei Seminary, Omaha, Nebraska, U.S.
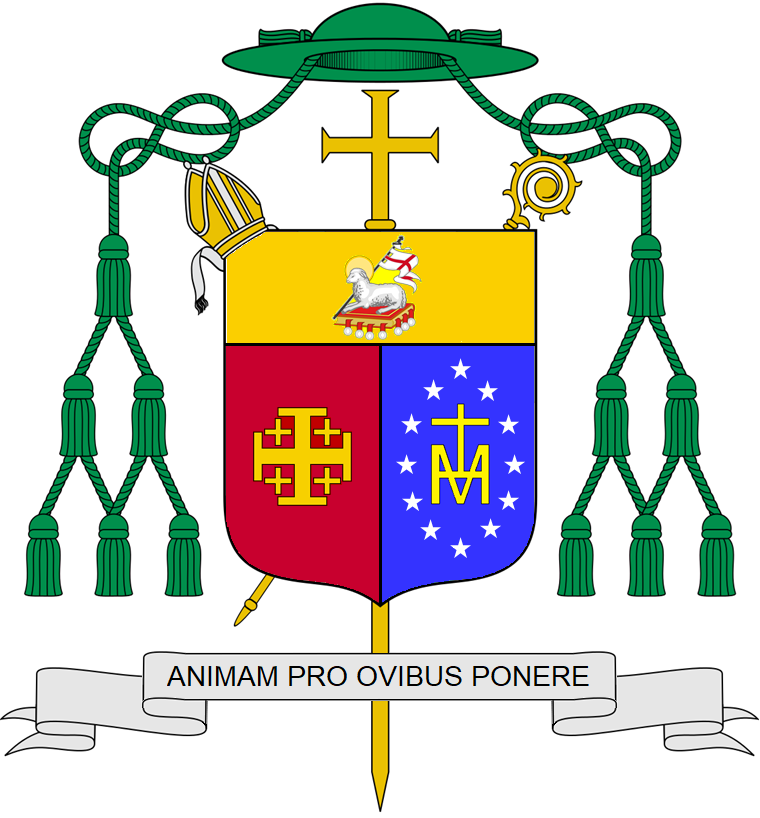
- Coat of arms: Mark Pivarunas's coat of arms

Ordination history of Mark Pivarunas
History
Priestly ordination
- Ordained by: George Musey
- Date: 27 June 1985
- Place: Mount Saint Michael, Spokane, Washington, U.S.
Episcopal consecration
- Consecrated by: Moisés Carmona
- Date: 24 September 1991
- Place: Mount Saint Michael, Spokane, Washington, U.S.
Episcopal succession
Bishops consecrated by Mark Pivarunas as principal consecrator
- Daniel Dolan: 30 November 1993
- Martín Dávila: 11 May 1999

Mark Anthony Pivarunas CMRI (born 31 October 1958) is an American sedevacantist Traditionalist Catholic bishop and the Superior General of the Congregation of Mary Immaculate Queen (CMRI).

== Biography ==
Pivarunas was born to Walter Pivarunas and to an ethnic Italian mother on 31 October 1958 in Chicago, Illinois, United States. He was baptized on 7 December of the same year, in Seven Holy Founders Church in the same city. He received his first Communion on 7 May 1966, and was confirmed on 6 June 1967.

Pivarunas entered the religious life in the sedevacantist Congregation of Mary Immaculate Queen (CMRI) in September 1974 at the age of 15. After a year's postulancy, he entered the novitiate on 8 September 1975, taking the religious name of Brother Mary Tarcisius. He made his first profession of vows on 12 September 1976. On 12 September 1980, he made his final profession of vows.

Pivarunas received the usual seminary training. On 27 June 1985, in the CMRI's Mount Saint Michael, having received the commendation of his superiors, he, along with two others, was ordained a priest by Bishop George Musey.

In August 1989, Pivarunas, now thirty years old, was elected Superior General of the CMRI.

Pivarunas traveled extensively throughout Nebraska, United States, and into neighboring states to provide the Mass and sacraments.

In January 1991, Bishop Moisés Carmona of Acapulco, Guerrero, Mexico, another sedevacantist bishop, visited Mount Saint Michael. Before his return to Mexico, on 1 February 1991, he left behind a letter expressing his desire to consecrate as bishop whomever the congregation chooses. On 3 April 1991, Pivarunas was elected to be consecrated a bishop.

In accordance with Catholic practice, he discontinued the use of his religious name, "Tarcisius".

On 24 September 1991, in Mount Saint Michael, Pivarunas was consecrated a bishop by Carmona.

On 30 November 1993, in Cincinnati, Ohio, United States, Pivarunas consecrated the sedevacantist Father Daniel Dolan a bishop.

On 11 May 1999, in Acapulco, Guerrero, Mexico, with Dolan assisting as co-consecrator, Pivarunas consecrated Father Martín Dávila of the sedevacantist Sociedad Sacerdotal Trento (Priestly Society of Trent) a bishop.

Since his episcopal consecration, Pivarunas has traveled to the United States, Mexico, Canada, New Zealand, South America, and Europe to provide Confirmation and other sacraments to several thousand children and adults. According to the CMRI, there are over a hundred priests and religious under his spiritual care.
