= Daniel Dolan =

American sedevacantist bishop (1951–2022)

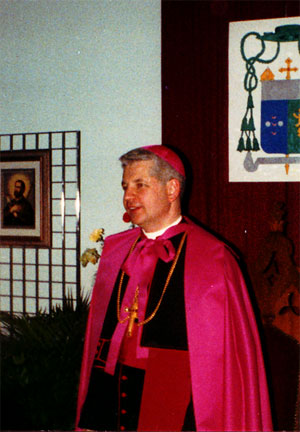
- Dolan in 1993
- Church: Saint Gertrude the Great, West Chester, Ohio, U.S.

Orders
- Ordination: 29 June 1976 by Marcel Lefebvre
- Consecration: 30 November 1993 by Mark Pivarunas

Personal details
- Born: 28 May 1951 Detroit, Michigan, U.S.
- Died: 26 April 2022 (aged 70)
- Education: The International Seminary of Saint Pius X, Econe, Switzerland
- Motto: Zelus domus tuae (Zeal for thy house [Ps. 68:10/69:9])
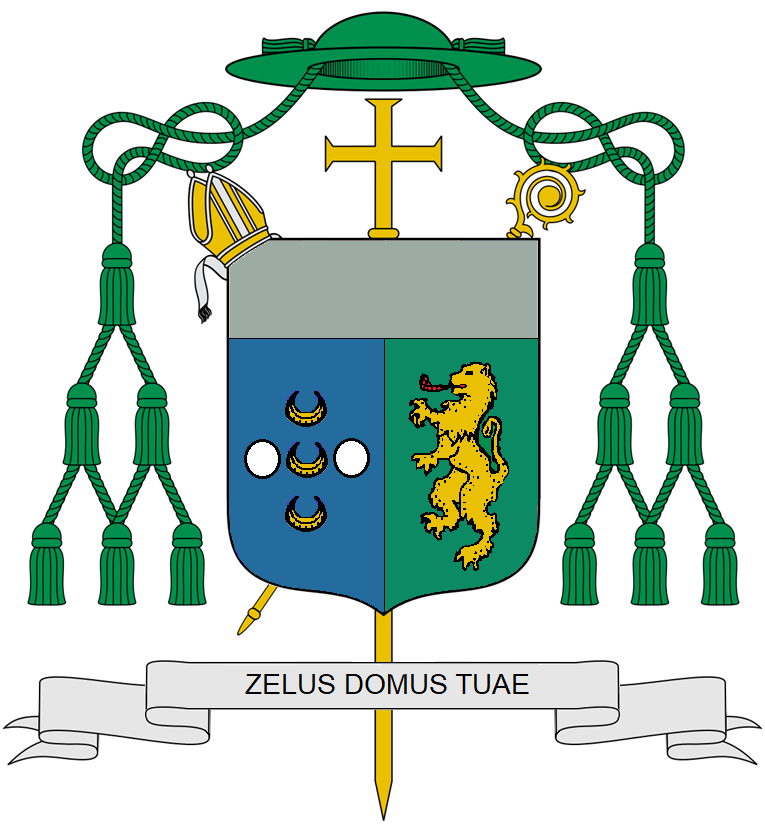
- Coat of arms: Daniel Dolan's coat of arms

Styles of Daniel Dolan
- Reference style: His Excellency; The Most Reverend
- Spoken style: Your Excellency
- Religious style: Your Excellency

Ordination history of Daniel Dolan
History
Priestly ordination
- Ordained by: Marcel Lefebvre
- Date: 29 June 1976
- Place: The International Seminary of Saint Pius X, Écône, Switzerland
Episcopal consecration
- Consecrated by: Mark Pivarunas
- Date: 30 November 1993
- Place: Saint Gertrude the Great, West Chester, Ohio, U.S.
Episcopal succession
Bishops consecrated by Daniel Dolan as principal consecrator
- Rodrigo da Silva: 29 September 2021
- Martín Dávila Gandara: 11 May 1999

Daniel Lytle Dolan (28 May 1951 – 26 April 2022) was an American sedevacantist Catholic bishop.

== Biography ==
=== Priesthood ===
Born on May 28, 1951, Dolan entered the minor seminary of the Archdiocese of Detroit in 1965, and continued his studies with the Cistercians, and finally at the Seminary of Saint Pius X in Ecône in Switzerland, where he was ordained a priest by Marcel Lefebvre on June 29, 1976. Already, in the autumn of 1973, as a seminarian, he came to the conclusion that Pope Paul VI was not a valid pope. In 1977, Dolan returned to the United States and within a few years founded 35 Mass centers for the society, including St Gertrude the Great Parish, which was established in West Chester, a suburb of Cincinnati, Ohio, in 1978.

In 1982, Marcel Lefebvre directed the Seminary of Saint Pius X's American priests to follow the 1962 liturgical books. Dolan and eight other American priests refused to do this. On 27 April 1983, these nine priests, along with some seminarians who were sympathetic to them, were promptly expelled from the Society of Saint Pius X (SSPX) by Lefebvre, for their refusal to use the 1962 Missal and for other reasons, such as their resistance to Lefebvre's order that priests of the SSPX must accept the decrees of nullity handed down by diocesan marriage tribunals, and their disapproval of the SSPX's policy of accepting into the society new members who had been ordained to the priesthood according to the revised sacramental rites of Paul VI. The priests swiftly formed the Society of Saint Pius V (SSPV).

=== Episcopacy ===
In 1989, Dolan left the Society of Saint Pius V and came into contact with the Congregation of Mary Immaculate Queen (CMRI). He was consecrated a bishop by Bishop Mark Pivarunas, the Superior General of that order, on 30 November 1993, at Saint Gertrude the Great, West Chester, Ohio.

On 11 May 1999, in Acapulco, Guerrero, Mexico, Dolan assisted Pivarunas as co-consecrator in the episcopal consecration of Martín Dávila Gandara of the Sociedad Sacerdotal Trento (Priestly Union of Trent).

On 22 February 2018, in Brooksville, Florida, Dolan assisted as Bishop Donald Sanborn as co-consecrator in the episcopal consecration of Joseph Selway of the Roman Catholic Institute.

On 29 September 2021, Dolan consecrated Brazilian Father Rodrigo Ribeiro da Silva, a former priest of the SSPX-Resistance, as a bishop for Mexico and South America.

Bishop Dolan and Fr Joseph Collins were instrumental in converting Ohio State Death Row inmate Joseph Murphy to Catholicism. Dolan baptized and confirmed Murphy after a period of religious instruction and corresponded and regularly conferred sacraments upon Joseph Murphy.

On 26 April 2022, Dolan suddenly died.
