= Francis Schuckardt =

American sedevacantist independent bishop (1937–2006)

Francis Konrad Schuckardt
- Superior General of the Congregation of Mary Immaculate Queen
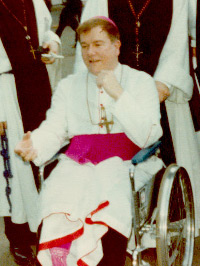
- Schuckardt at Mount Saint Michael in 1979
- Predecessor: Office established
- Successor: Denis Chicoine

Orders
- Ordination: 1971 by Bishop Daniel Q. Brown
- Consecration: 1971 by Bishop Daniel Q. Brown

Personal details
- Born: July 10, 1937 Seattle, Washington, U.S.
- Died: November 5, 2006 (aged 69) Redmond, Washington, U.S.
- Denomination: Sedevacantist
- Education: Seattle University, Seattle, Washington, U.S.

Ordination history of Francis Schuckardt
History
Diaconal ordination
- Ordained by: Daniel Q. Brown
- Date: October 29, 1971
- Place: Chicago, Illinois, U.S.
Priestly ordination
- Ordained by: Daniel Q. Brown
- Date: October 31, 1971
- Place: Chicago, Illinois, U.S.
Episcopal consecration
- Consecrated by: Daniel Q. Brown
- Date: November 1, 1971
- Place: Chicago, Illinois, U.S.
Episcopal succession
Bishops consecrated by Francis Schuckardt as principal consecrator
- Joseph Belzak: May 19, 2006
- Andrew Jacobs: May 19, 2006

Francis Konrad Schuckardt (July 10, 1937 – November 5, 2006) was an American sedevacantist independent bishop.

Born in Seattle, Washington, Schuckardt is described by Michael W. Cuneo as "the rock-and-roll outlaw of Catholic traditionalism—the bad influence that people somehow can't bring themselves to stop talking about. During the late sixties and early seventies, Schuckardt almost single-handedly founded an influential community in the Pacific Northwest that was characterized by a peculiar blend of Catholic survivalism, paranoia, and lockstep dogmatism."

Schuckardt was noted in 1997 as being of "immense symbolic importance" to the Catholic far-right, despite the fact Schuckardt had "spent much of the past decade either on the run or in hiding". In the 1980s, he was accused of sexual and financial misconduct. He died on November 5, 2006.

== Biography ==
Francis Konrad Schuckardt was born in Seattle, Washington on July 10, 1937 to Frank and Gertrude Schuckardt. He graduated from O'Dea High School in 1954 and from Seattle University in 1959 with a bachelor's degree in education and linguistics.

In 1958 Schuckardt joined the Blue Army of Our Lady of Fatima, and eventually became one of its highest administrators. In 1967, Schuckardt was dismissed from the organisation for publicly rejecting Vatican II.

In 1968, Schuckardt founded a Catholic traditionalist community based in Coeur d'Alene, Idaho, called the Fatima Crusade.

In 1971, Schuckardt was ordained a bishop by Daniel Q. Brown. Brown had been consecrated a bishop 2 years prior, on 21 September 1969, by Hubert A. Rogers, a bishop of the North American Old Roman Catholic Church. The co-consecrators were James H. Rogers and George T. Koerner. At the time of the consecration, Brown was part of the North American Old Roman Catholic Church. During the year 1971, Brown left the North American Old Roman Catholic Church and became independent.

In 1971, Schuckardt changed the name of his group to Tridentine Latin Rite Church.

== Positions ==
Schuckardt was a sedevacantist. He insisted his Traditional Latin Rite Catholic Church group was not a "new church", but a continuation of the Catholic Church. His followers refer to the Catholic Church as the "Modern Catholic Church" or the "Post-Vatican Council II Church" or the "Church of the Beast". They labelled Pope Paul VI the "arch-heretic of Rome".

A Spokesman-Review article states that Schuckardt claimed to be the only true Catholic bishop. In that article, Schuckardt is quoted as saying: "Some of our teachers, studying the French revolution, saw the origins of the red, white, and blue, which was adopted then. The red represented the thousands of bishops and priests who were nailed to the church doors."

== Misconduct allegations ==
In April 1984, four former seminarians reported that they had been sexually abused by Schuckardt.

On June 3, 1984, Denis Chicoine made several public charges from the pulpit against Bishop Schuckardt to the effect that he had set aside large amounts of cash and checks for himself, related in a Spokesman Review article on August 26, 1984.

Regarding Chicoine's allegation of finding large amounts of cash and out-of-day checks, The Spokesman-Review quoted Bishop Schuckardt as saying "an assistant failed to properly handle the matter and that he was unaware of the problem."

In an article by Tim Hanson that appeared in The Spokesman-Review article on August 26, 1984 Schuckardt is quoted as saying: "If there is some way I can just let the people know we didn't run away. We were sent away. We were thrown out of our home. If there was anyway we could have stayed there, we would have. They must know that it was made impossible." The article goes on to state that On June 7, 1984 Chicoine filed a lawsuit in Superior court asking that Schuckardt and 10 of his associates be prohibited from returning to the church property at Mount St. Michael's or Schuckardt's mansion at E2314 South Altamont Blvd.

After leaving Spokane, they moved around and finally settled in Greenville, California. “One of the main reasons we move is because of the harassment we’ve been getting from Chicoine” stated loyal Bishop Schuckardt follower, Brother Mary Fidelis, “They're trying to do anything they can to destroy us, literally. We fear harm, physical harm, coming to the Bishop. We wouldn't put anything past them.” As further reported by Jim Sparks in The Spokesman-Review. On May 9, 1987 a Plumas County, California Sheriff's Department SWAT team, with support from the California Highway Patrol, conducted a raid on the TLRCC.

== Other criticisms ==
Bishop Lawrence Welsh, Bishop of the Diocese of Spokane, wrote of Schuckardt in the Inland Register (a diocesan newspaper): "Bishop Schuckardt has received no mission from the church universal and does not accept the unity of the apostolic office. Yet these are some of the very elements which make the Church Roman Catholic." In another section Bishop Welsh adds: "[T]hey deny the teaching authority of the Second Vatican Council and the last four Popes. Implicitly Bishop Schuckardt has set himself up as the final and last arbiter of Catholic tradition."

Schuckhardt was also criticised for insisting upon a modest dress code for women. Women were required to have long dresses and counseled to keep their heads covered at all times.

== Later life ==
For the remainder of his life Schuckardt lived in the Seattle area. As reported November 2005, the TLRCC had about 100 members in the area. The article states: "At the heart of the mysterious group lies its founder, Francis Konrad Schuckardt, a charismatic leader who considers himself to be the true Pope, according to members of the group." The church has no public address or telephone number.

In 2002 a reporter from The Seattle Times attempted to obtain an interview with Schuckardt for an article, but requests were denied because of health reasons, although the reporter was allowed to conduct an extensive interview with six Church members and given access to Church services.
