= Los TECOS =

Secret society based in Mexico

TECOS
- Tarea Educativa y Cultural hacia el Orden y la Síntesis
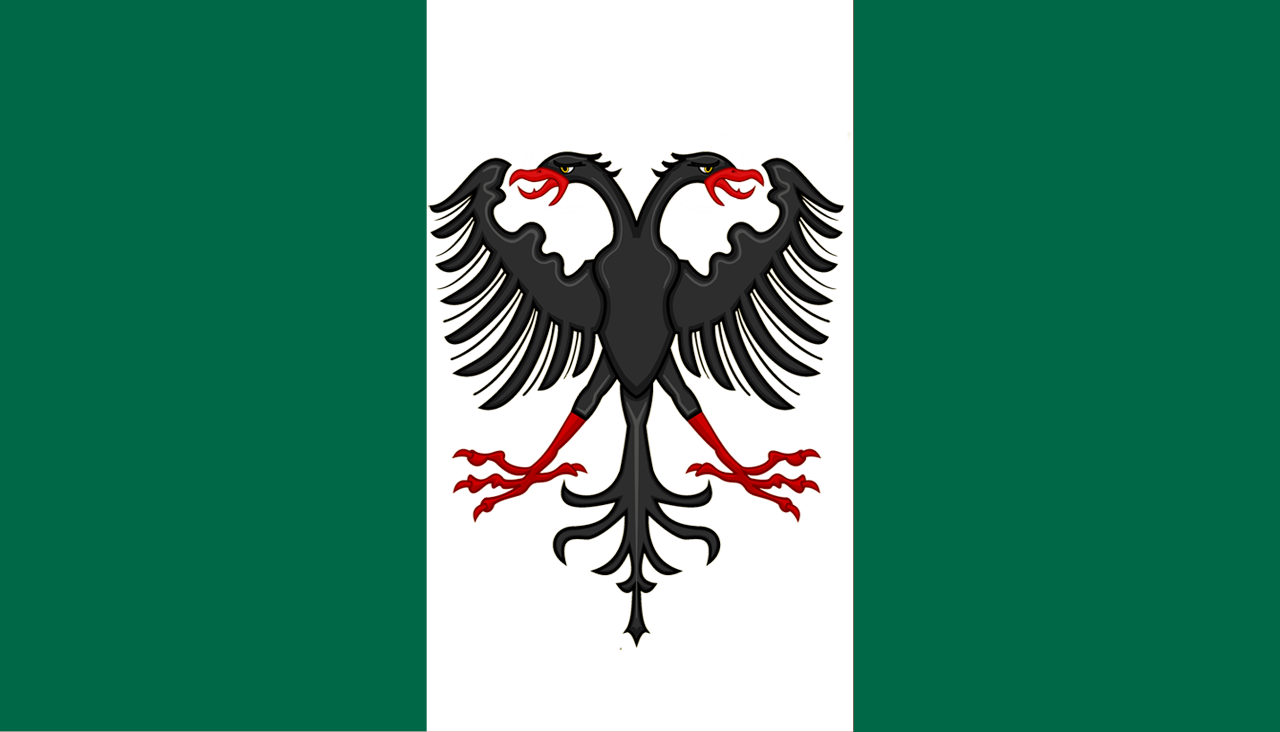
- Formation: 1934 (92 years ago)
- Type: Secret society
- Headquarters: Guadalajara, Jalisco, Mexico
- Key people: Carlos Cuesta Gallardo; Antonio Leaño (es); Raimundo Guerrero; Jorge Prieto (ru); Antonio Leaño Reyes
- Main organ: Réplica
- Secessions: El Yunque (split c. 1965)
- Affiliations: World Anti-Communist League

Los TECOS is a Mexican secret society associated with neo-Nazism, integrism and national Catholicism. Founded in Guadalajara, Jalisco, Mexico in the early 1930s, it traditionally operated a major degree of influence over the staff faculty and student youth of the Universidad Autónoma de Guadalajara. An outgrowth of the aftermath of the Cristero War and the disputes in Mexico over the introduction of Marxism into the state-run education system, the organisation developed along staunch anti-communist lines, as well as positioning itself as opposed to what it claimed was a "Judeo-Masonic conspiracy."

The organisation grew further during the 1950s and played a leading role in the World Anti-Communist League, essentially leading the Latin America branch of the operation. Like the communists who they opposed, Los TECOS developed a number of front groups, with mass membership (not bound by the oaths of the secret society), which it sought to control and direct from behind the scenes. These groups were typically student, rightist Catholic and anti-communist groups, some engaged in violence with the far-left militants, while others were concerned with propaganda and more subtle lobbying.

Los TECOS spawned a number of branches in different states of Mexico. One of these, in Puebla, was known as El Yunque. This organisation, while sharing the same Catholic ultra-conservative worldview, split with Los TECOS in the early 1960s in a bitter feud over the religious question of the Second Vatican Council. Los TECOS and a number of their spiritual advisors, including the Jesuit priest, Fr. Joaquín Sáenz y Arriaga, were pioneers in forming the sedevacantism thesis, while El Yunque upheld the post-Concillar Vatican City-based claimants to the Papacy from Pope Paul VI onward as legitimate.

== Etymology ==
There are different opinions as to the origin of the name TECOS and its meaning. According to some sources, it is an acronym for Tarea Educativa y Cultural hacia el Orden y la Síntesis ('Educational and Cultural Work towards Order and Synthesis'). A second layer of meaning to the name is that teco (or in full tecolote) in Mexican Spanish signifies 'owl'; in a defence of the Universidad Autónoma de Guadalajara printed in The Washington Post, they claimed that the name was in reference to "the student's devotion to late night academic studies". A daughter of a Los TECOS member claimed "Yes, it does mean owl. Los Tecos are owls whose eyes are red. The members of the group are called Los Tecos because they are up all night doing their thing." Their influence at the university was such that, the association football team associated with it was named Tecos Fútbol Club.

== History ==
=== Background: Mexican politics in the 1920s ===
The origins of Los TECOS finds its roots most directly in the conservative and Catholic pushback to political developments in Mexico in the 1920s, which came to the fore in the Mexican Revolution, in the aftermath of the fall of the moderate liberal-regime of the Porfiriato period. Although General Porfirio Díaz was a Freemason himself and adhered to Liberal Party positions, he did not actively enforce anticlericalism (even though this technically remained on the books), so as a compromise, his reign had been relatively tolerated by Mexican conservative elements. After radicals launched a coup known as the Plan of San Luis Potosí, which overthrew the moderate Díaz, some conservative opponents of the revolutionaries and politically active Catholics backed the rise of General Victoriano Huerta (who had been supported in this venture by the German Empire), but his reign was only short lived. In the aftermath of this, the Carrancistas and other radicals engaged in a general backlash against Mexican Catholics (whether or not they had backed Huerta) and developed anti-Catholic additions to the 1917 Mexican Constitution. At the same time, the Bolshevik October Revolution in Russia took place, which inculcated in Mexican conservative elements the idea that there was a global conspiracy to overthrow Christianity.

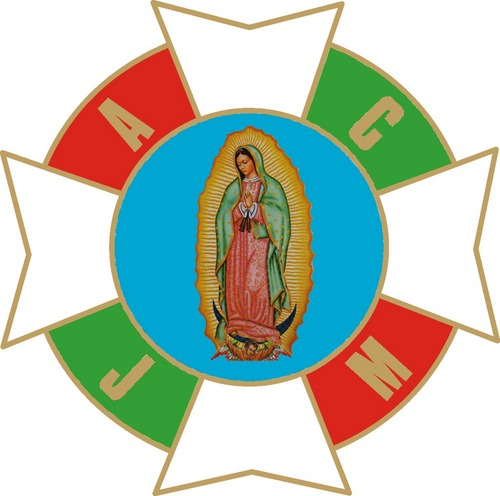
Logo of the ACJM, founded by Fr. Bernardo Bergöend SJ. Many Mexican national Catholic organisations, open and secret, trace their inspiration to him.

Against this "Masonic", secularist bourgeoisie vision of a society, Mexican Catholics founded a number of organisations to resist anticlericalism and coordinate together for the purpose of "Christian order in Mexico". This included the Asociación Católica de la Juventud Mexicana (ACJM), a mostly lay association sponsored by the Society of Jesus, which had been created in 1913 by Fr. Bernardo Bergöend, a French-born Jesuit, with the approval of José Mora y del Río, the Archbishop of Mexico. After the increasingly radical anticlerical additions to the Mexican Constitution of 1917 which enforced secular education as mandatory, saw the state take control of Church property and made it a requirements for priests to register with local government authorities to operate, a Catholic backlash grew, which was centered on the ACJM. They created a political party, the Partido Católico Nacional (PCN) which participated in the political process and in the 1920 election, backing the National Republicans, but lost out to the radically anticlerical Álvaro Obregón of the Partido Laborista Mexicano.

With the rise to power of Obregón's handpicked successor, Plutarco Elías Calles, also a Laborista, the so-called Calles Law in 1926 was enacted, which more closely enforced the 1917 Constitution and added in provisions of his own, such as seeking to exclude Catholic priests from participating in political life, a rebellion took place known as the Cristero War. As well as the ACJM which played a leading role on the Cristero side, the Liga Nacional Defensora de la Libertad Religiosa, which had been founded in 1925, would also play a central role. The Cristeros, though in many ways traditionalist, were not purely reactionary, endorsing a social Catholicism based on Rerum novarum, which saw them gain support from some of the peasantry and indigenous communities in their revolt against the liberal and radical "masonic" ruling-class. Ultimately, the institutional Church was persuaded to remove their support, as part of a United States-negotiated peace and militarily the rebellion drew to an end, though explicit violent state persecution continued until Calles was forced into exile by his successor, Lázaro Cárdenas, who had taken over the Partido Revolucionario Institucional (PRI) which Calles had founded.

=== Foundation and the struggle over education ===
During the years of the Maximato, when Calles continued to control affairs behind the scenes, the PRI began to take a more socialist direction; in 1931, Narciso Bassols, an atheistic materialist, became the first Marxist to hold office in Mexico as the Secretary of Public Education. With an anticlerical and anti-conservative speech entitled the Grito de Guadalajara, Calles openly announced a plan to enter a "psychological revolutionary period", where the state would take control of all education in Mexico to "seize the conscience of childhood" for the Revolution. After the rise of Cárdenas, Bassols continued on and developed the next phase of this revolutionary education program, known as "socialist education", whereby all schools would teach children according to the principles of Marxist materialism and atheism. In addition to this, Marxists had other roles in the Cárdenas regime: created from CROM, the labour union CTM was a major player at this time, under the control of Vicente Lombardo Toledano. Although never a member of the Mexican Communist Party, Lombardo Toledano was nevertheless, strongly pro-Soviet and his Jewish ancestry was used by elements of the ultra-right as evidence of the Cárdenas regime being a "Judeo-Masonic-Communist" conspiracy and the Bolshevisation of Mexico as taking place.

Eternal enemies stalk her and try to make her triumphs nugatory. It is necessary that we enter the new period of the Revolution, which I call the psychological revolutionary period; we must seize the consciences of childhood, the consciences of youth because they are and must belong to the Revolution. It is absolutely necessary to get the enemy out of that trench where the clergy are, where the conservatives are; I mean school. It would be a very serious blunder, it would be criminal for the men of the Revolution, if we did not wrest the youth from the clutches of the clergy and from the clutches of the conservatives; and unfortunately the school in many states of the republic and in the capital itself is run by clerical and reactionary elements.

— Plutarco Elias Calles, Grito de Guadalajara, 20 July 1934.

In the aftermath of the Cristeros War, with the rise of the PRI and ongoing revolutionary persecution of varying manifestations, politically active Catholics in Mexico began to develop "reserved" or secret societies to resist. The organisations had a pyramidal structure, divided into small cells which had no contact with each other; ironically, this structure was similar to the paramasonic revolutionary organisations that they so vehemently fought against. Some of these groups include La Legión or Los Legiones (founded in 1932 by Manuel Romo de Alba and close to the Jesuits and synarchism), its successor La Base (founded in 1934, which would eventually create the Unión Nacional Sinarquista), and Los Conejos (founded in 1935 in Mexico City). Los TECOS, founded at Guadalajara, Jalisco in 1934, was one of these rightist Mexican Catholic "reserved" societies. The founding members of the organisation were 23-year-old lawyer Carlos Cuesta Gallardo (1911–1985) and Antonio Leaño Alvarez del Castillo (1911—2010). Although support within the order was not total, various priests from the Society of Jesus, also known as the Jesuits, supported Los TECOS and the move toward the foundation of Universidad Autónoma de Guadalajara, this included; Fr. José de Jesús Martínez Aguirre, Fr. Manuel Cordero, Fr. Joaquín Figueroa de Luna, Fr. Ramiro Camacho and Fr. Joaquín Sáenz y Arriaga.

Scott Anderson and Jon Lee Anderson have claimed that Carlos Cuesta Gallardo visited the Third Reich in Germany during the Second World War. What he did there is clouded in mystery, but the Andersons and others have speculated that he was there, in contact with German agents, to potentially organise setting up a formation sympathetic to the Axis powers on the Rio Grande as an insurance policy against the United States. This was part of a pattern in Germany–Mexico relations as the Germans had already intervened in the Mexican Revolution previously and the controversy surrounding the Zimmermann telegram during World War I (part of a plan to aid a Mexican Reconquista of Texas, Arizona and New Mexico). In the early 1930s, the young Cuesta Gallardo had already been obsessed with the concept of a Judeo-Masonic conspiracy and was a fan of literature to this effect from outside of Mexico, such as the International Jew by Henry Ford and the Protocols of the Learned Elders of Zion, likely by the Russian Okhrana, according to a contemporary Luis Calderón. Cuesta Gallardo has been accused of later writing under several different pseudonyms, his own books of the same genre, including under the name of “Traian Romanescu” (a supposed Romanian exile), with the most popular work of this kind being La Gran Conspiración Judía ("The Great Jewish Conspiracy"), published in Mexico in 1961. As well as La Complot contra la Iglesia ("The Plot Against the Church"), as a collaborative effort, under the name of “Maurice Pinay”, released at the start of the Second Vatican Council. Many of these works were released as part of the Biblioteca de secretos políticos ("Library of Political Secrets") series.

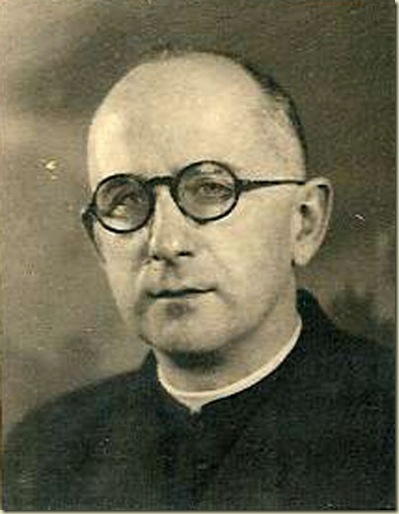
The works of Argentine Jesuit priest, Fr. Julio Meinvielle, were very popular with Los TECOS members and were distributed widely by them at conferences.

Carlos Cuesta Gallardo recruited a young intellectual, Raimundo Guerrero, into Los TECOS, who drew in other students and academics to the banner of the UAG and through the university became the public facing lead for Los TECOS, while Cuesta Gallardo and Leaño Alvarez del Castillo were the power behind the scenes. UNESCO's World University Organization held its conference in Buenos Aires, Argentina in 1952 and Guerrero was dispatched to represent the UAG/Los TECOS. This proved to be an excellent networking opportunity for the organisation, as they came into contact with Argentine students of a similar mindset, the followers of Fr. Julio Meinvielle, a Jesuit priest (associated initially in their Argentine domestic politics with a Catholic radical right faction of Peronism, they would go on to create in a few years time their own Movimiento Nacionalista Tacuara), in addition to this, they built up connections with members of the Arab League, such as the Saudis, with whom they shared a mutual opposition to Zionism and an obsession with "Jewish conspiracies." The relationship with Fr. Meinvielle was maintained over many years, his books were later distributed by Los TECOS at World Anti-Communist League conferences and he was even invited to speak at the Guadalajara conference in the 1970s.

Los TECOS, instead of being abstentionist, engaged in a broad public relations campaign to advance their objectives. While condemning the United Nations in their own private works as part of the "Masonic conspiracy", they, at the same time, used UNESCO's World University Organization to build up relations with radical right, anti-communist, anti-masonic and antisemitic forces across the world throughout the 1950s. Most audacious was their achievement of acquiring vast funding through the academic world for their university, which they developed into a credible entity as one of the most important in Latin America (particularly in the medical field), but also funneled some of these funds into their own political activities. The biggest windfall was secured in 1962, according to Stefan Thomas Possony, who said that "after years of financial starvation, Guadalajara UAC received money from the Rockefeller, Ford and Carnegie Foundations as well as from the Agency for International Development (AID). This happy change was accomplished by Luis Garibay, rector of the university and Guerrero's compadre." In their own publications, Los TECOS had denounced Nelson Rockefeller as a "Jew" (along with other American leaders, Franklin D. Roosevelt and Harry "Solomon" Truman). The Brazilian organisation Tradition, Family, Property (TFP), a conservative Catholic rival of Los TECOS on the Latin American scene claimed the man most responsible for this was Dr. Oscar Wiegand, a zoology professor at the University of Texas, who took the Dean, Luis Garibay Gutierrez on a tour of 12 universities in the United States to solicit donations. Between 1964 and 1974, nearly $20,000,000 worth of grants were passed through these American institutions to the UAG, controlled by Los TECOS. According to a report in the Albuquerque Journal, "they believe they are using Jewish gold to combat the Jews."

=== Second Vatican Council and Sedevacantism ===
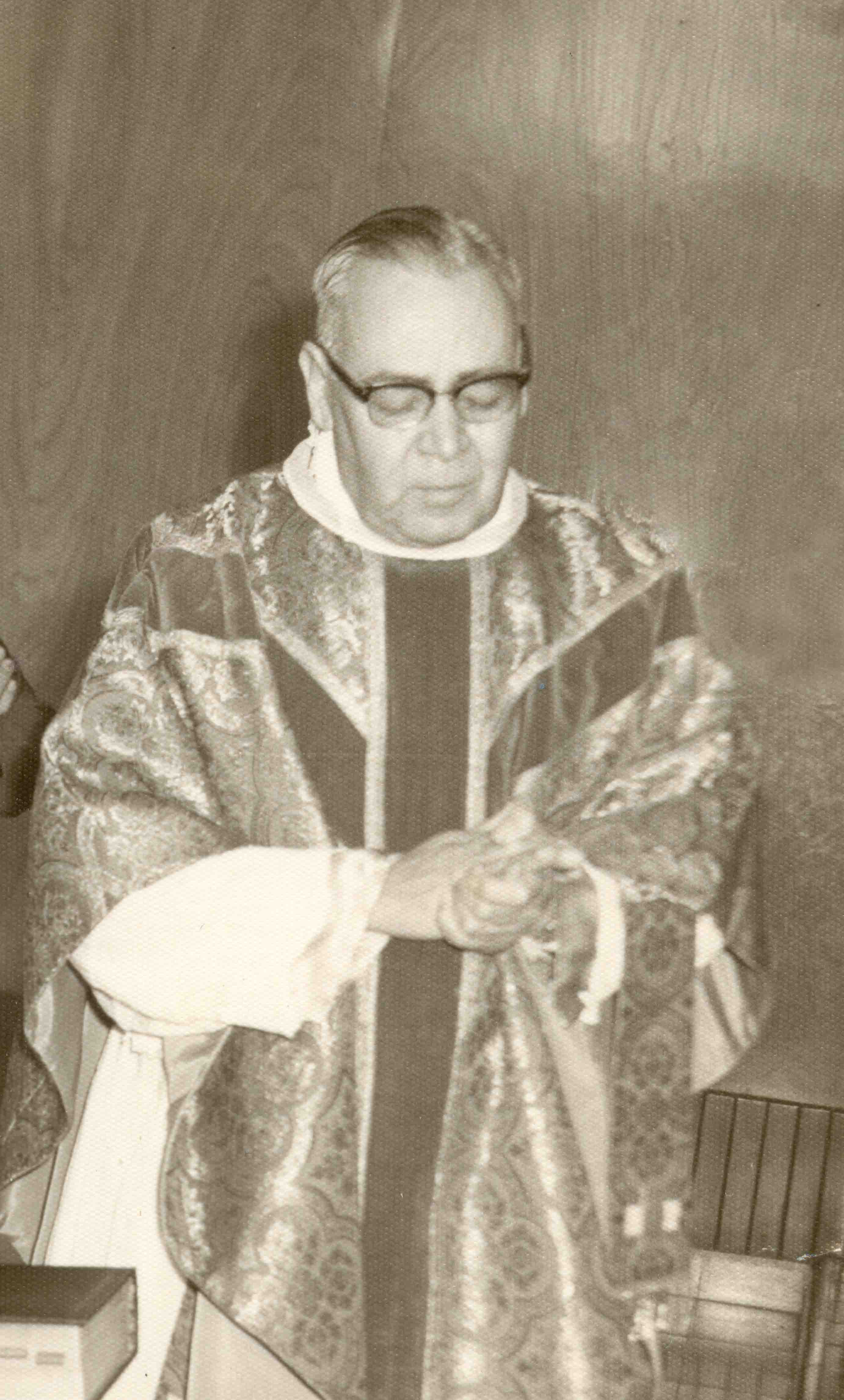
The Mexican Jesuit priest, Fr. Joaquín Sáenz y Arriaga, longtime associate of Los TECOS, was one of the pioneers of sedevacantism after the Second Vatican Council.

Los TECOS are noted for being pioneers in the development of sedevacantism. Even during the Second Vatican Council, Los TECOS attempted to have an influence on proceedings, working particularly against the document Nostra aetate (a document on the relationship between the Catholic Church and the Jews). In October 1962, with the opening of the council, a document entitled Il Complotto contro la Chiesa ("The Plot Against the Church") under the pseudonym of Maurice Pinay was anonymously distributed to all attending, causing great controversy. The document was originally authored in Spanish and is alleged by Scott Anderson and Jon Lee Anderson to have been authored by members of Los TECOS; Carlos Cuesta Gallardo and Garibi Velasco, with some Italian sources attributing its spread at the Council in part to Fr. Joaquín Sáenz y Arriaga, a Mexican priest and former Jesuit who was a spiritual advisor to Los TECOS. It warned vigilance to the Council members, with the 800-page polemic claiming that since the times of Christ, for 1900 years, Judaism had worked to overthrow Christianity and the Catholic Church, claiming involvement of the "Synagogue of Satan" in every major heresy, as well as encouraging "enemies" such as Freemasonry and Communism.

In 1965, after the conclusion of the Second Vatican Council, a meeting was held by Los TECOS at the house of Anacleto González Guerrero (son of the Cristero martyr Anacleto González Flores) in the Distrito Federal. Also present at the meeting was Antonio Leaño Álvarez del Castillo, one of the co-founding leaders of Los TECOS and Ramón Plata Moreno, the lay founding member of El Yunque; according to Manuel Díaz Cid, a co-founder of El Yunque. Leaño put forward the position of Los TECOS, proposing that they should all declare that the seat of St. Peter was now vacant, based on the claim that Paul VI (Giovanni Montini) was actually a "Jewish infiltrator" (Note: This claim was not unique to Los TECOS but was also promoted by a number of other radical traditionalist groups and individuals. One of the main "proofs" of this, was Paul VI appeared in public a number of times wearing a piece of clothing which was not usual for Papal regalia and insignia. Holding together a Papal stole, he wore a small 12 stoned breast plate in miniature of the Jewish high priest (known as the Rational of Judgement). Never before had this been worn by a Pope and it has never been explained by the Vatican. Due to the changes at Vatican II that Paul VI promulgated, sedevacantists such as Los TECOS saw this as a symbol of Judaism's infiltration and overthow of the Catholic Church. This forms part of the claim in Fr. Joaquín Sáenz y Arriaga's New Montinian Church.) and thus could not be a true Catholic Pope. In response, El Yunque, represented by Plata and Díaz Cid took a more cautious line; although they were not happy with the developments coming out of Rome and filial criticisms were warranted, they nevertheless insisted that Pope Paul VI was a legitimate Pope, based on the promise of Jesus Christ in Matthew 28:20 saying "I am with you all days, even to the consummation of the world." Leaño took an ashtray that had been on the table and marked a boundary with it, saying that there could be no more collaboration and that Los TECOS would now consider El Yunque an enemy.

In Mexico, the battle between traditionalists and progressivists, involving Los TECOS members represented among the former, intensified throughout the 1960s and 1970s. The premier priest representing Los TECOS views, Fr. Sáenz y Arriaga, came into conflict with Cardinal Miguel Darío Miranda y Gómez, earning a reprimand when he published the book Con Cristo o contra Cristo in 1966 (despite it having an imprimatur from Juan María Navarrette y Guerrero, the Archbishop of Hermosillo). The favourite clerical target of Los TECOS in Mexico, with attacks regularly published in Réplica, was Sergio Méndez Arceo, the so-called “Red Bishop” of Cuernavaca, a pioneer in liberation theology, who, along with Ivan Illich founded the Centro Intercultural de Documentación (CIDOC), influenced by Marxism and Freudian psychoanalysis. After Paul VI attended the CELAM conference held at Medellín in 1968 (a landmark in the history of Latin American liberation theology) and a New Order of Mass was introduced, the published works of Fr. Sáenz y Arriaga became even more strident. With The New Montinian Church arguing explicitly that Paul VI was an illegitimate Pope and crypto-Jew who had the goal of creating a Kabbalistic “homocentric religion of universal brotherhood.” This book led to Cardinal Miranda declaring Fr. Sáenz y Arriaga suspension a divinis in December 1971, debate swirled as to whether this amounted to excommunication and Los TECOS members attacked the house of the Cardinal in Mexico City with graffiti saying “Sáenz sí, Miranda no.” Many of these views were reiterated and refined in the 1973 work Sede Vacante: Paul VI is Not a Legitimate Pope, the book from which the term sedevacantism is derived. These views were also voiced in Sáenz y Arriaga’s publication Trento, founded in 1972, which, eventually became the Unión Católica Trento; a sedevacantist organisation aligned with Los TECOS.

=== FEMACO, CAL and the World Anti-Communist League ===
As fervent anti-communists, the Cold War years made it possible for Los TECOS to develop influence far beyond Mexico. On 29 September 1968, they created the Federación Mexicana Anticomunista de Occidente (FEMACO) with many other Mexican anti-communist organisations, but in which they were the controlling interest. The organisation was led by two members of Los TECOS: professors from the Universidad Autónoma de Guadalajara, Raimundo Guerrero (Gallardo's closest ally) and Rafael Rodríguez López. This coalition included, as well as radical rightists, members of the mainstream conservative PAN, especially younger activists, which would cause a problem for the party old guard. Another leading figure in this FEMACO campaign was Jorge Prieto Laurens, who had long been a staunch Mexican anti-communist Catholic activist. Having organised anti-communist conferences in Latin America since the 1950s, he used his contacts to propose at the World Anti-Communist League Conference in Manila in 1971, that the next conference be held in Mexico.

The World Anti-Communist League (WACL) had originated from the Asian Peoples' Anti-Communist League and was organised out of Taipei, Republic of China on Taiwan (including many Korean, Japanese, Filipino, Vietnamese and other members). In 1967, the Asians had formed an alliance with the primarily Eastern European Anti-Bolshevik Bloc of Nations (who were under the leadership of Yaroslav Stetsko) to form WACL. With the Federación Mexicana Anticomunista de Occidente (FEMACO); under the control of Los TECOS; being designated the hosts of the sixth World Anti-Communist League Conference between 28 and 29 August 1972 at Mexico City, the Mexicans were given the responsibility of forming the Confederación anticomunista latinoamericana (CAL), giving Los TECOS immense influence over an entire Continent of anti-communist activities. Specifically, this took place at Guadalajara during a number of secret sessions, chaired by Ku Cheng-Kang (the President of the World Anti-Communist League), José J. Roy, Raimundo Guerrero and Rafael Rodríguez López (the main leaders of FEMACO). Attendees at the foundation of CAL were forty people from Bolivia, Argentina, Colombia, Costa Rica, Brazil, Guatemala, Cuba (exiles belonging to the Alpha 66 group) and Mexico. This would lead to the spread of Los TECOS motto contra la guerrilla roja, la guerrilla blanca ("against the red guerrilla, the white guerrilla").

Los TECOS in particular, earned the ire of the British and American sections within the World Anti-Communist League (WACL), who objected to what they saw as their ultra-Catholic theocratic worldview and antisemitism. Los TECOS never hid that they believed communism to be a Jewish conspiracy and were happy for speakers at the conference to openly vocalise this. The American Chapter was controlled by the United States Council for World Freedom, which included members of the American New Right, aligned with a Mont Pelerin Society-style classical liberalism, coupled with anti-communism. Mainstream politicians such as Walter Judd and Strom Thurmond were associated with it and it tended to have a focus on "freedom and democracy". Due to rumours of the Mexican group's activities, the ACWF prepared an internal report, authored by Austrian-born American Stefan Thomas Possony, about Los TECOS control of CAL. Possony had authored some serious academic works critiquing Marxist theory, was associated with the Hoover Institute and pioneered the Strategic Defense Initiative ("Star Wars") concept. Possony claimed that Los TECOS' "anti-Semitism and antimasonism serve to conceal anti-Americanism." Seeking to distance themselves from Los TECOS in light of the report, without losing face politically, the ACWF adopted the following resolution worded by Reed Irvine, "Anti-Semitism is incompatible with enlightened, civilized conduct and we condemn the communist states for the practice of it."

Tecos is not only anti-Semitic, it is also anti-American and opposes most of the goals ACWF stands for, e.g., freedom. It claims to be la legion de Cristo Rey, which is fighting for the re-establishment of a Christian order, but it regards the Church as infiltrated by Jews and Masons, and wants Pope Paul Vl — supposedly a concealed Jew and drug addict — to be deposed as a heretic. Although the cristero movement predates the various nazi and fascist movements, Tecos has personal and ideological links with the remnants of the Rumanian [sic] Iron Guard and possibly the Croat Ustashis. It seems to be connected with several neo-fascist movements. Nazi traces are visible. I found no references to representative government, none to democracy or national self-determination.

— Stefan Thomas Possony, an internal ACWF dossier about Los TECOS, 1972.

As part of the processes of WACL, the host of the previous conference provided the president for the next term (in this case it was Raimundo Guerrero of Los TECOS/FEMACO/CAL) and the hosts were set to be the British chapter in London for 1973. However, the British representatives, the Foreign Affairs Circle under Geoffrey Stewart-Smith (a Member of Parliament and leading Conservative Monday Club figure) entered into a dispute about some of the characters who had been allowed to attend the Mexican-hosted conference, in particular Jesús Palacios Tapias, from the Barcelona-based CEDADE, who had appeared in uniform and stated that Marxism was simply a "tool to install the tyranny of the Jews." The idea of such people appearing in London was too much for Stewart-Smith and when some sympathetic Americans sent him the private Possony memos attacking Los TECOS, he took the issue to the Asian WACL leaders. However, the Taiwanese generally allowed the local chapters to run their own affairs and thus did not interfere with the operations of CAL led by Los TECOS and in any case, had their own reservations about the sincerity of Anglo-American "anti-communism", appearing more irritated by Stewart-Smith's obstructionism. (Note: There was a general anti-British and anti-Yankee sentiment from the Latin American chapter, motivated by national Catholicism and also many of the Western European chapter members who were supported by Los TECOS had neo-Nazi (and in some cases, "old Nazi") orientations, seeing the Anglo-Americans as the enemies of Western civilisation in World War II, aiding the communism conquest of Eastern Europe. Although not necessarily signing up to Los TECOS presentation of this as a "Judeo-Masonic conspiracy", the Taiwanese who ran the World Anti-Communist League had practical reasons to distrust the Anglo-Americans too. The British had voted in United Nations General Assembly Resolution 2758 (XXVI) to remove the Republic of China in Taiwan as the Chinese representative to the United Nations, in favour of the communist People's Republic of China in 1971. The 1972 visit by Richard Nixon to China signified a shift in the position of the United States and Nixon was pictured shaking hands with Mao. They also questioned why a communist state in Cuba was allowed to develop right under the nose of the United States, without the Americans assassinating Fidel Castro or enabling a serious coup by Cuban exiles.) In the end, the London conference was cancelled and the British chapter footed with a $84,000 bill (they subsequently left WACL). Meanwhile, the Latins rallied around the Mexicans and the light was shined on the American chapter compiling secret hostile reports against other members, which the Latins then used to accuse the Anglo-Americans of being part a plot to wreck WACL, aiding communism and the Bolivian chapter claimed that the anti-TECOS memo was a "pro-Zionist document", that "proves what has been said that the American council is one of the instruments of Zionism to control the WACL." Especially among the TECOS-led Latins and the Asians of WACL in this period, an anti-imperialism of the right was adopted, suspicious of both "sides" of the Cold War.

== See also ==
- National Synarchist Union
- Revolutionary Mexicanist Action
- Tacuara Nationalist Movement
- Revue internationale des sociétés secrètes
- Sodalitium Pianum
