= Mount Saint Michael =

- U.S. National Register of Historic Places
- U.S. Historic district
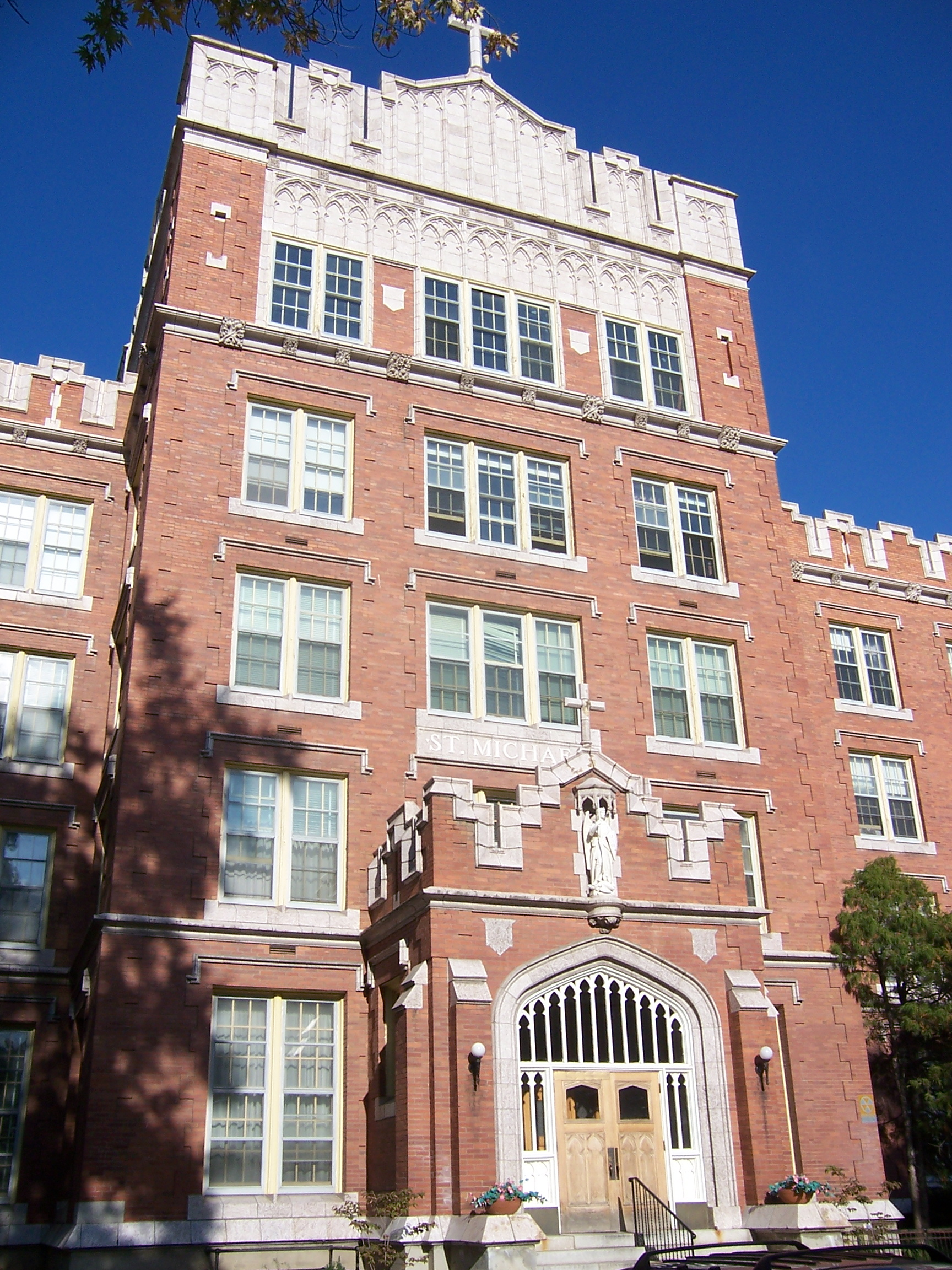
- Mount St. Michael

- Location within Washington (state)
- Location: 8500 N. Saint Michael Rd.
- Nearest city: Spokane, Washington
- Coordinates: 47.7315°N 117.3413°W
- Built: 1915–1917
- Architect: Julius A. Zittel
- Architectural style: Gothic Revival
- NRHP reference No.: 00000456
- Added to NRHP: May 5, 2000

Mount Saint Michael (known colloquially as The Mount) is a former seminary, school, farm and retreat center in Spokane, Washington, for the Jesuits. It was later sold to the Congregation of Mary Immaculate Queen (CMRI), a sedevacantist religious congregation.

It serves as the home of Saint Michael's Academy and as a parish center for sedevacantists in the Spokane area. It is staffed by the priests, brothers and sisters of the Congregation of Mary Immaculate Queen. The main building serves as the motherhouse for the sisters. The rectory for the priests and brothers is also located on the property in a separate building.

Mount Saint Michael is listed on the National Register of Historic Places by the National Park Service.

== Early history ==
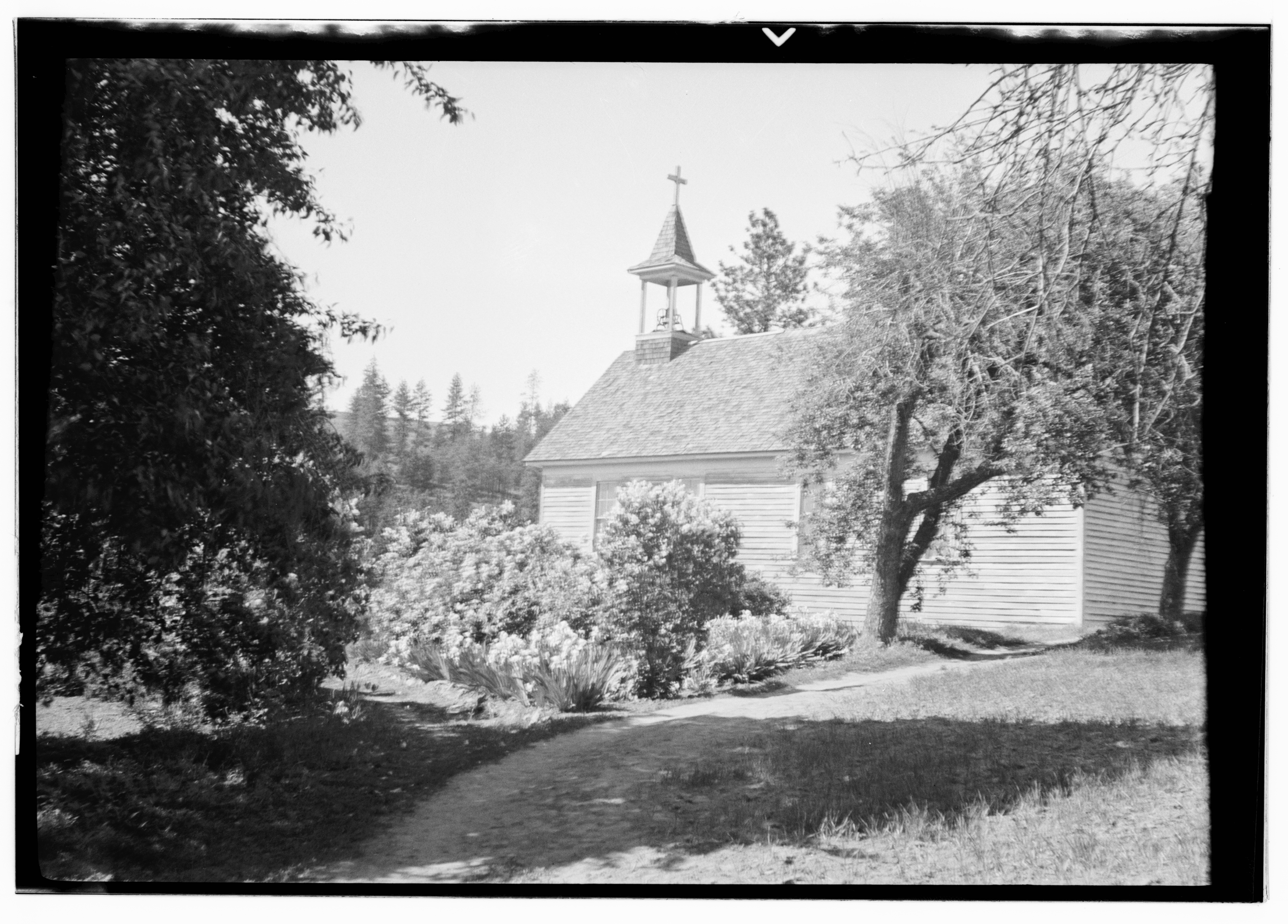
St. Michael's Mission Church

St. Michael's was founded by Father Joseph Caruana as a Jesuit mission just north of Spokane in the mid-19th century to serve the Native Americans in the area. In 1878, Caruana's successor, Father Joseph Cataldo, moved the mission to its current location with a purchase of almost 1,000 acres (4 km^{2}) of land at the price of $2 per acre. From 1881 until 1915, Mount St. Michael was used primarily as a farm, supplying now-Gonzaga University with fresh produce and dairy products.

In the spring of 1915 construction began on a scholasticate to accommodate the rising number of vocations to the Jesuit order at the cost of $400,000. Father Arthuis, who had just completed St. Aloysius Gonzaga Church at Gonzaga University, was placed in charge of construction. He built a railroad 1100 feet (340 m) in length to convey building materials up the 320 foot (98 m) bluff. The four story Tudor-Gothic building was built in the shape of a "T" and contained a chapel, dining room, kitchen, gymnasium, physics and chemistry labs, lecture halls and residences for the scholastics.

In the 1920s, a grotto of Our Lady of Lourdes was built by one of the Jesuit brothers in fulfillment of a vow. Mass is offered at the outdoor chapel and faithful often gather here to pray the Rosary.

In 1929, work began on the three-story west wing. The new wing housed another 100 students and contained the new library. In 1930 a seismometer from Gonzaga University was moved to a basement laboratory at Mount St. Michael, where seismologists kept careful records of seismic activity. Mount St. Michael soon gained international acknowledgement as an important seismographic center.

At this time the 700 acre (2.8 km^{2}) farm provided all the food needed for the seminary. Jesuit brothers, farmers, tailors, bakers, cobblers, bee keepers and horticulturists, saw to the material needs of the community and the formation of the candidates placed in their charge. It was said to be one of the finest Jesuit houses of study in the world.

In the 1960s the Jesuit order experienced a drastic drop in the number of vocations and Mount St. Michael closed its doors as a scholasticate in 1968. For the next ten years, Mount St. Michael served as a residence for retired Jesuit priests and as an ecumenical prayer and retreat center.

== Sedevacantist congregation ==
In 1977, the Jesuits sold Mount St. Michael to an investment company, and it was eventually bought by the sedevacantist organisation Congregation of Mary Immaculate Queen. Mount St. Michael served as a boys' school, seminary and rectory for the priests and brothers of the Congregation.

Today, the east wing serves as a cloistered residence for religious sisters associated with CMIQ. The west wing houses CMIQ offices, a religious gift shop with traditional Catholic books and religious goods, a library, and Saint Michael's Academy, a sedevacantist K-12 school for boys and girls.

A chapel located on the second floor serves as the parochial and school church and is used for the solemn celebration of the sacred liturgy in the Tridentine Mass.

== Sexual abuse allegations ==
In September 2002 and January 2003, two lawsuits alleging sexual abuse of "roughly 25 plaintiffs" were filed against former Catholic priest Patrick O'Donnell, not a member of CMRI, also naming the Catholic Diocese of Spokane as a defendant for its failure to protect children from O'Donnell. Two of the plaintiffs, brothers Steve and Terry Barber, allege that O'Donnell molested them at the Mount St. Michael Seminary. O'Donnell has admitted to molesting some, but not all, of the plaintiffs.

== See also ==
- List of Jesuit sites
