= Sedevacantism =

Traditionalist Catholic movement

The emblem of the Holy See in sede vacante

Sedevacantism is a traditionalist Catholic movement which generally holds that since the 1958 death of Pius XII the occupiers of the Holy See are not valid popes due to their espousal of one or more heresies and that, for lack of a valid pope, the See of Rome is vacant. Sedevacantism owes its origins to the rejection of the theological and disciplinary changes implemented following the Second Vatican Council (1962–1965).

The term sedevacantism is derived from the Latin phrase sede vacante, which means "the chair [of the Bishop of Rome] being vacant". The phrase is commonly used to refer specifically to a vacancy of the Holy See which takes place from the pope's death or renunciation to the election of his successor.

The number of sedevacantists is unknown and difficult to measure; estimates range from tens of thousands to hundreds of thousands. Various factions of conclavists among sedevacantists have proceeded to end the perceived vacancy in the Holy See by electing their own pope.

== Etymology ==
The term sedevacantism derives from the Latin term sede vacante, which means "with the chair being vacant". In the Catholic Church, when an episcopal see becomes vacant due to the death or removal of a Bishop from office for whatever reason, in the interim the diocese is automatically in a state of sede vacante, until a new designate is appointed and duly elevated to his see. With Sedevacantism, this is specifically in reference to the See of Saint Peter, i.e., the Catholic Papacy.

The Sedevacantist thesis that the post-Second Vatican Council claimants to the Papacy operating out of the Vatican City are non-Catholic Antipopes, originated from a 1973 work, Sede Vacante: Paul VI is Not a Legitimate Pope, by the Mexican Jesuit priest Joaquín Sáenz Arriaga. However, there were some instances of proto-sedevacatism, avant la lettre, reaching back into the 1960s.

== History ==
=== Early sedevacantism: origins in the 1960s ===
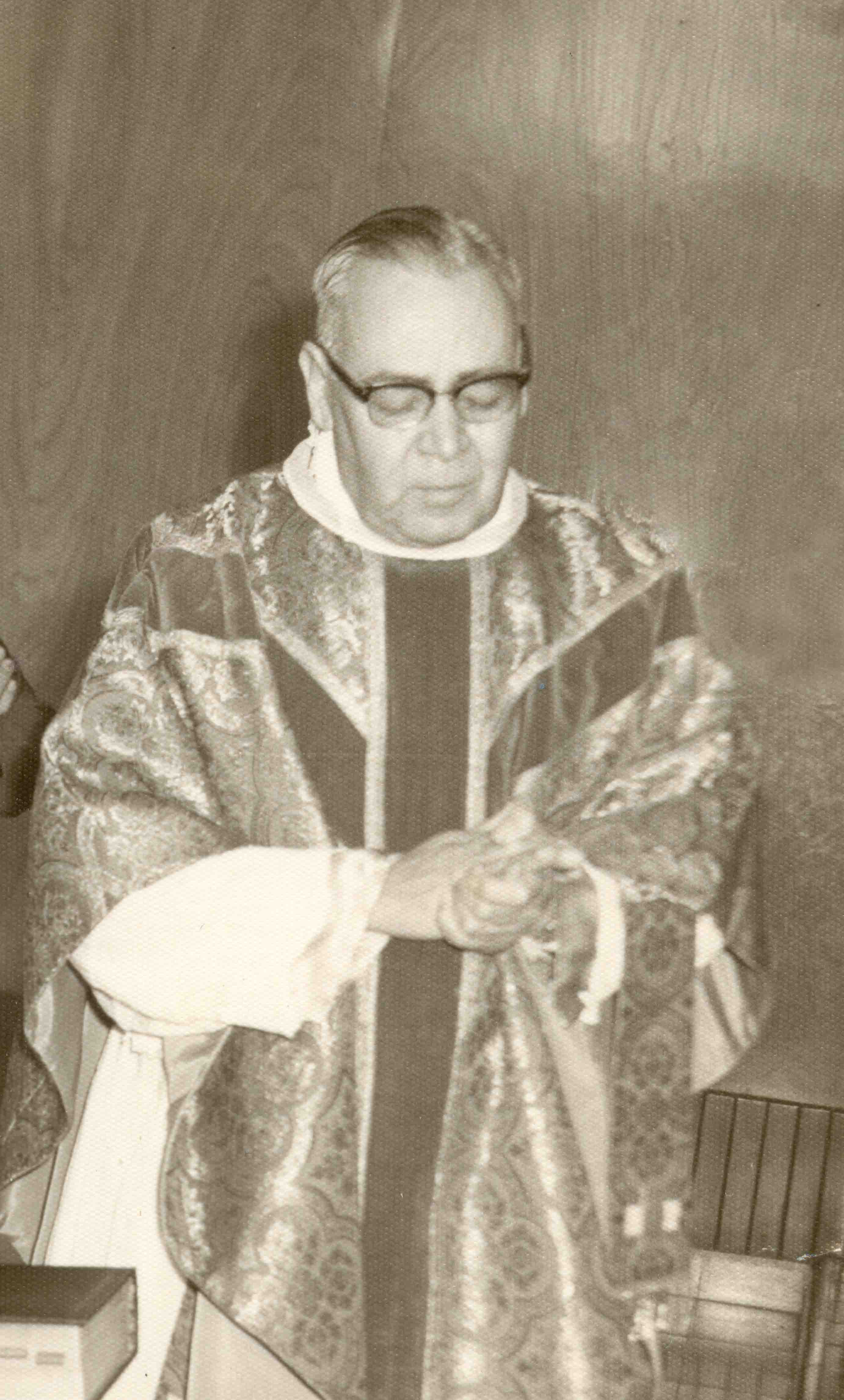
The Mexican Jesuit priest, Fr. Joaquín Sáenz y Arriaga, longtime associate of Los TECOS, was one of the pioneers of sedevacantism after the Second Vatican Council.

Sedevacantism, avant la lettre, is evidenced from the mid-1960s, as part of a response to the Second Vatican Council in the Roman Catholic Church. The earliest example is from a group of traditionalist Catholics in Mexico associated with the radical right secret society Los TECOS based in Guadalajara, in particular their spiritual director, Fr. Joaquín Sáenz y Arriaga, a Jesuit priest. In 1965, at a private meeting in the house of Anacleto González Guerrero (son of the Cristero martyr Anacleto González Flores), Los TECOS' leaders proposed the motion that Paul VI (Giovanni Montini) was a crypto-Jew and an illegitimate Pope, and that this line should be officially adopted as the position of Mexican traditionalists.

A connected secret society, based in Puebla under Ramón Plata Moreno, known as El Yunque, although ultra-conservative as well and unhappy about the liberalising changes in the Catholic world, rejected the proposal of Los TECOS, stating that Pope Paul VI was indeed the legitimate Pope of the Catholic Church. This led to a deadly split in the Mexican traditionalist scene.

Earlier, during the Second Vatican Council, Los TECOS had distributed a document entitled Complotto contro la Chiesa ("The Plot Against the Church") under the pseudonym of Maurice Pinay, warning Council fathers of a supposed "Judeo-Masonic-Communist" plot to infiltrate and destroy Christianity and the Catholic Church.

Another early expositor from Latin America was Carlos Alberto Disandro in Argentina, a personal associate of Juan Perón, belonging to the Catholic wing of orthodox Peronism, who raised the question in 1969 with his book Pontificado y Pontífice: una breve quaestio teológica ("Pontificate and Pontiff: a brief theological quaestio [inquiry]").

=== The New Montinian Church (1970s) ===
As changes in the aftermath of the Second Vatican Council filtered down to the local diocesan and parish level by the early 1970s, especially with the introduction of a New Order of Mass as the primary form of public worship, the sedevacantist issue began to be voiced more stridently and publicly by its advocates. One landmark was a 1971 work by Fr. Sáenz y Arriaga, called The New Montinian Church, which explicitly brought into the public sphere views that had previously circulated in private among these nascent groups. The New Montinian Church claimed: "My suspicions appear confirmed, Giovanni Battista Montini was invalidly elected to the Papacy and, thus, is not a true Pope. Because of this ritualistic symbol of Judaism and Masonry, I suspect that Paul VI was not only the most efficient instrument of the 'Jewish Mafia,' but an integral part of this Mafia." A public controversy ensued and the Vatican, acting through the local ordinary, Cardinal Miguel Darío Miranda y Gómez declared the suspension a divinis of Sáenz y Arriaga.

Sáenz y Arriaga founded the publication Trento (in reference to the Council of Trent) in 1972 to promote sedevacantism, along with Mexican priests, Fr. Moisés Carmona and Fr. Adolfo Zamora. This was followed up by the 1973 work Sede Vacante: Paul VI is Not a Legitimate Pope, from which the theory was framed more comprehensively and from which the sedevacantist movement would derive its name.

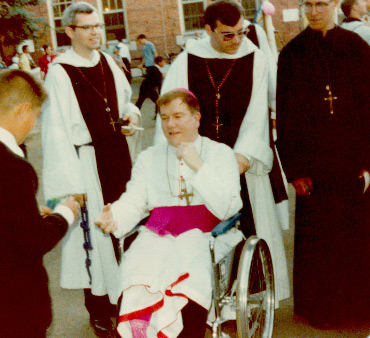
Francis Schuckardt was a major figure in American sedevacantism, founding what would eventually become the Congregation of Mary Immaculate Queen. His reception of religious orders from Old Catholic sources would remain a subject of contention.

The earliest American traditionalist organisation to take up the line of Fr. Sáenz y Arriaga was the Orthodox Roman Catholic Movement, which was founded in 1973 under Fr. Francis Fenton (a member of the National Council of the John Birch Society). The group also included Fr. Robert McKenna who would go on to become a significant figure in sedevacantism and later a Thục-line Bishop. However, the most numerically significant American group was founded by a Catholic layman, Francis Schuckardt; this was eventually called the Congregation of Mary Immaculate Queen.

== Positions ==
=== Principal claims ===
Sedevacantism is based on rejection of theological and disciplinary changes implemented following the Second Vatican Council (1962–1965). Sedevacantists reject this council, on the basis of their interpretations of its documents on ecumenism and religious liberty, among others, which they see as contradicting the traditional teachings of the Catholic Church and as denying the unique mission of Catholicism as the one true religion, outside of which there is no salvation. They also say that new disciplinary norms, such as the Mass of Paul VI promulgated on 3 April 1969, undermine or conflict with the historical Catholic faith and are deemed blasphemous, while post-Vatican II teachings, particularly those related to ecumenism, are labelled heresies. They conclude, on the basis of their rejection of the revised Mass rite and of postconciliar church teaching as false, that the popes involved are also false. Even amongst traditionalist Catholics, this is a quite divisive question.

Traditionalist Catholics who are not sedevacantists recognize the line of popes leading to and including Leo XIV as legitimate. Sedevacantists, however, claim that the infallible Magisterium of the Catholic Church could not have decreed the changes made in the name of the Second Vatican Council, and conclude those who issued these changes could not have been acting with the authority of the Catholic Church. Accordingly, they hold that Pope John XXIII and his successors have left the true Catholic Church and thus lost legitimate authority. A notorious heretic, they say, cannot be the Catholic pope.

Most sedevacantists believe that this Great Apostasy started with the Second Vatican Council, although there are disagreements about whether the last legitimate Pope was John XXIII or Pius XII, with the latter position being held by those who believe the 1958 conclave results were illegitimate; this particular belief is usually associated with the Giuseppe Siri conspiracy theory. However, there are other sedevacantist positions that describe the Great Apostasy as having started with Benedict XV in 1914, meaning that Pope Pius XII and Pope Pius XI were also heretics and making the last legitimate Pope Saint Pius X.

While sedevacantist arguments often hinge on interpretations of modernism as being a heresy, this is also debated.

=== Authority to declare an Antipope ===
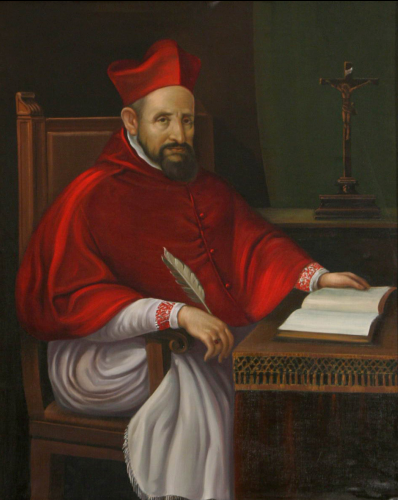
Citing the Jesuit theologian Robert Bellarmine, some sedevacantists argue that a heretical Pope automatically loses office and is no longer Pope by the very fact of consenting to heresy.

An issue facing sedevacantists in attempting to justify their position, was how to deal with the question of who from a Catholic perspective has the legitimate authority to judge or declare a man, who the world at large considered the legitimate Pope (Paul VI), to instead be a non-Catholic Antipope and manifest, public and notorious heretic.

One of the Sedevacantist currents is referred to as the "Jesuit faction", and is represented by Fr. Joaquín Sáenz y Arriaga and his base within the Mexican sedevacantists and later American factions influenced by them such as the CMRI; this current looks especially to Jesuit Doctor of the Church Robert Bellarmine and Jesuit Francisco Suárez. The CMRI cites Bellarmine, writing in his De Romano Pontifice: “The pope manifestly a heretic ceases by himself to be pope and head, in the same way as he ceases to be a Christian and a member of the body of the Church; and for this reason, he can be judged and punished by the Church. This is the opinion of all the ancient Fathers, who teach that manifest heretics lose immediately all jurisdiction.” That is to say, by becoming a public and notorious heretic, a reigning Pontiff tacitly resigns office automatically by the very act of consenting to heresy itself, without any formal procedure being required.

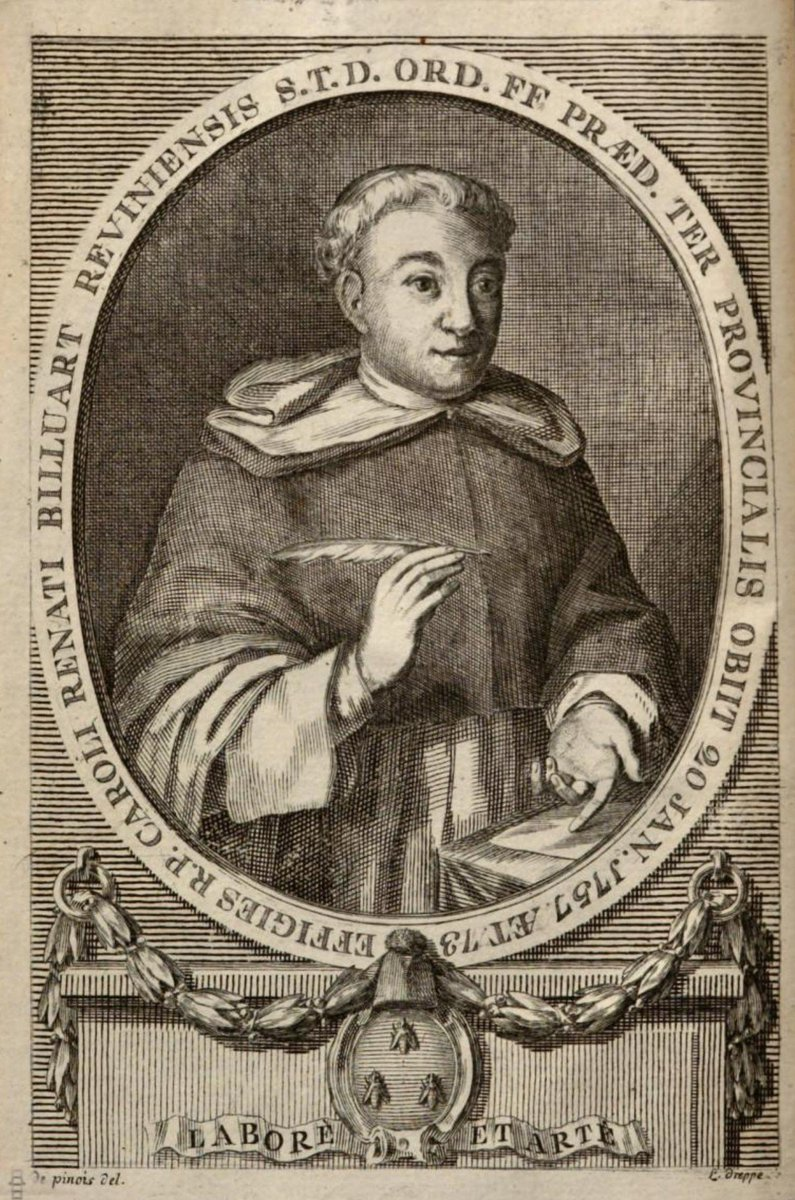
Following the likes of Charles René Billuart, the Dominican faction argued that a heretical Pope must be juridically deposed by procedure of a General Council. This led them to develop the sedeprivationist thesis.

Given that the sedevacantist movement during the time of Paul VI consisted of a very small number of lower clergymen who had been ordained by the Roman Catholic Church and laymen who had followed them (being without a single Bishop who publicly endorsed the sedevacantist position in public until Ngô Đình Thục in the early 1980s), the likelihood that such juridical proceedings by a General Council would be initiated against Paul VI was incredibly marginal. After the death of Paul VI in 1978, the opportunity to do this had passed and Guérard des Lauriers was forced, by the logic of his own arguments, to adopt the position of sedeprivationism in 1979 – breaking with sedevacantism proper or “totalism” as it is sometimes called – claiming instead that the Vatican-based, post-Conciliar claimants to the Papacy were indeed Popes “materially but not formally.”

=== Circumstances for a future Pope ===
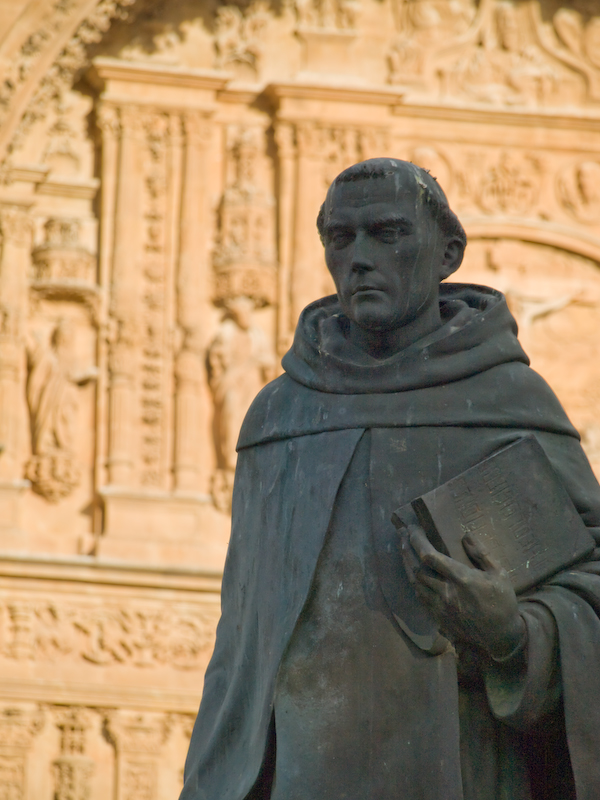
Citing the opinion of Francisco de Vitoria, Professor Tomás Tello Corraliza proposed that "faithful bishops" in a General Council could theoretically elect a new Pope.

Since the 1990s, a small number of ex-sedevacantists became conclavists and have had themselves "elected" claiming to be Pope, using different methods; the most notable of these are David Bawden, Victor von Pentz and Lucian Pulvermacher, but they gained negligible acceptance and credibility within sedevacantism.

Professor Tomás Tello Corraliza, a Spanish sedevacantist, authored a study in 1994 entitled "The Election of the Pope", exploring possibilities. This study was subsequently published in the German journal Einsicht (No. 1, February 2003), edited by Dr. Eberhard Heller, where he explores the opinions of influential Catholic theologians on this question, including Thomas Cajetan, Robert Bellarmine, Francisco de Vitoria, John of St. Thomas, Dom Gréa, Louis Billot and Charles Journet. Another position, favoured by Tello, is that of de Vitoria, founder of the School of Salamanca, who in his work De ecclesiastica potestate ("On the Church Power"), suggested in the absence of Cardinals, faithful Catholic Bishops in General Council (to the exclusion of the laity and lower clergy) could elect a new Pope.

=== Clergy, Mass, and sacraments ===
Some sedevacantists accept the consecrations and ordinations of sedevacantist bishops and priests, and the offering of Masses and the administration of sacraments by the said bishops and priests, to be licit because of epikea, i.e. "the interpretation of the mind and will of him who made the law".

=== "Una cum" liturgical controversy ===
According to sedevacantist priest Anthony Cekada, there is a controversy among sedevacantists whether it is permissible to go to "una cum" Masses and whether or not it amounts to a mortal sin. These "una cum" masses are Traditional Latin Masses that name the current pope in the "Te igitur" prayer, specifically where the priest says "una cum famulo tuo Papa nostro N" ("together with Your Servant N., our Pope."). Cekada argues that it is not, under any circumstances, permissible. The anti-sedevacantist traditional Catholics John Salza and Robert Siscoe argue that the disagreements over una cum masses discredit sedecavantism, as many sedecavantists have condemned each other as heretics over the controversy, and that due to the issue many sedevacantists do not attend mass at all.

== Believers and organisations ==
Because sedevacantists, particularly the laity, are not concentrated into one single organisation, it is difficult to ascertain exact numbers of sedevacantists in the world, however the number has been estimated at around 30,000 people worldwide. These are mostly concentrated in the United States, Mexico, Canada, France, Italy, Spain, Australia and the United Kingdom, but the actual size of the movement has never been accurately assessed. It remains extremely difficult to do so for a wide range of reasons, such as the fact that not all sedevacantists identify as such, nor do they necessarily belong to avowedly sedevacantist groups or societies.

=== Sedevacantist groups ===
Sedevacantist groups include:

- Congregation of Mary Immaculate Queen (CMRI), formed in 1967. It operates in North America, South America, Europe, and Asia and is based in Omaha, Nebraska, United States. Its bishop is Mark Pivarunas.
- Most Holy Family Monastery (MHFM), a traditionalist Catholic monastery in Fillmore, New York, founded in 1967 and led by Michael and Peter Dimond.
- Society of Saint Pius V (SSPV), formed in 1983 when nine American priests split from the Society of Saint Pius X over a number of issues including using the liturgical books implemented under Pope John XXIII. It operated in North America from Oyster Bay Cove, New York, United States, and was headed by Bishop Clarence Kelly until his death in December 2023. SSPV is now based in Norwood, Ohio, United States.

=== Early proponents ===
Early proponents of sedevacantism include:

- Bishop Francis Schuckardt, an American who was illicitly consecrated a bishop by the Old Catholic bishop Daniel Q. Brown. He founded the Congregation of Mary Immaculate Queen (CMRI), from which he was expelled in 1984. He later established a new sect, the Traditional Latin Rite Catholic Church (TLRCC).
- Joaquín Sáenz y Arriaga, a Mexican Jesuit priest and theologian who put forward sedevacantist ideas in his books The New Montinian Church (August 1971) and Sede Vacante (1973).
- Francis E. Fenton, an American priest inspired by Sáenz's writings and founded the Orthodox Roman Catholic Movement as an American parallel to the Mexican Unión Católica Trento.
- Michel-Louis Guérard des Lauriers, a French Dominican priest and theologian who developed the Thesis of Cassiciacum in the 1970s. He was illicitly consecrated bishop in 1981 by Ngô Đình Thục.
- Several American priests of the Society of Saint Pius X (SSPX): Daniel Dolan, Anthony Cekada, and Donald Sanborn, who were expelled with several other priests by Archbishop Marcel Lefebvre for their sedevacantism in 1983. Nine of these priests later founded the Society of Saint Pius V (SSPV) in the same year. Dolan and Sanborn were later illicitly consecrated bishops.
- Lucian Pulvermacher, an American missionary priest who left the Catholic Church in 1976 and in 1998 was elected pope of the conclavist "True Catholic Church" with the papal name "Pius XIII".

=== Sedevacantist bishops ===
==== Consecrated before Vatican II ====
The only known Catholic bishop consecrated before the Second Vatican Council who publicly became sedevacantist was Vietnamese Archbishop Ngô Đình Thục (consecrated in 1938), former Vicar Apostolic of Vĩnh Long, Vietnam and former Archbishop of Huế, Vietnam.

Bishop Alfredo Méndez-Gonzalez (consecrated in 1960), former Bishop of Arecibo, Puerto Rico, though not having publicly identified as a sedevacantist, associated himself with sedevacantist priests and consecrated a bishop for them.

==== Thục-line bishops ====
Many sedevacantist bishops derive their claims to holy orders and episcopacy from Archbishop Thục or bishops of his lineage.

Some bishops in the sedevacantist world derive their lineage from the Palmarian Catholic Church (also known as the Carmelites of the Holy Face); this is due to Thục having consecrated as Bishop Clemente Domínguez y Gómez, later the Pope of the Palmarian Church and consequently the Palmarians making many more consecrations. An example of this from Spain is the case of sedevacantist bishop Pablo de Rojas Sánchez-Franco of the Pía Unión de San Pablo Apóstol, who was consecrated a bishop by Ricardo Subirón Ferrandis, a former Palmarian bishop turned sedevacantist. De Rojas was at the centre of a significant controversy in 2024, as an entire monastery of nuns belonging to the Poor Clares from Belorado went into schism with the Vatican and attempted to place themselves under his jurisdiction, losing their monastery in the ensuing court battle.

On 7 May 1981, Thục consecrated the sedeprivationist French priest Michel-Louis Guérard des Lauriers as a bishop. Des Lauriers was a French Dominican theologian and a papal advisor.

On 17 October 1981, Thục consecrated the sedevacantist Mexican priests Moisés Carmona and Adolfo Zamora as bishops. Carmona and Zamora had been sedevacantist leaders and propagators in Mexico.

The Vatican declared Thục latae sententiae excommunicated for these consecrations and for his declaration of Sedevacantism.

==== Méndez-line bishops ====
On 19 October 1993, in Carlsbad, California, United States, Bishop Méndez-Gonzalez consecrated the sedevacantist Clarence Kelly of the Society of Saint Pius V (SSPV) to the episcopacy. By Méndez's wish, the consecration was kept secret until his death in 1995.

==== Whose lineages derive from earlier movements ====
A considerable number of sedevacantist bishops are thought to derive their holy orders from Bishop Carlos Duarte Costa, who in 1945 set up his own independent Brazilian Catholic Apostolic Church. While Duarte Costa was not a sedevacantist, he instead questioned the papacy as an institution, denying papal infallibility and rejecting the pope's universal jurisdiction. In contrast to most Catholic traditionalists, Duarte Costa was theologically liberal, and his critiques of the papacy came from that direction.

== Related concepts ==
=== Sedeprivationism ===
In contrast to sedevacantists, sedeprivationists affirm the Thesis of Cassiciacum by the Dominican theologian Bishop Michel-Louis Guérard des Lauriers as being a valid position, which states that John XXIII and his successors are popes materialiter sed non formaliter ("materially but not formally"), and that post-Vatican II popes will become legitimate once they recant their heresies.

Sedeprivationism is the position endorsed by the Istituto Mater Boni Consilii.

=== Benevacantism ===
A separate minority position called Benevacantism (a portmanteau of "Benedict" and "sedevacantism") holds that Pope Benedict XVI continued as pope following his resignation, with Pope Francis ruling as a heretical antipope. Since Benedict's death, some Benevacantists now hold to sedevacantism, while others considered Francis to be the Pope until Francis' death in 2025. For its part, the Vatican rarely acknowledges or addresses the claims of sedevacantists at all; however, after increased visibility during the time of Francis, Francis in 2024 compared sedevacantists to "mushrooms" and said "they carry sadness in their hearts, I have compassion for them".

== Society of St. Pius X ==
The Society of St. Pius X, founded by Archbishop Marcel Lefebvre in 1970 as a "pious union" with the permission of François Charrière, the sitting Bishop of Lausanne, Geneva and Fribourg in Switzerland, was by far the largest traditionalist Catholic organisation internationally, founded to push back against the introduction of the Novus Ordo Mass and aspects of the Second Vatican Council. The public line taken by Lefebvre during his lifetime and the SSPX since, is to affirm the legitimacy of the claimants to the Papacy in the Vatican City, but to "resist" anything they claim is contrary to Catholic tradition; thus, as part of the traditionalist Catholic movement, they are adjacent to sedevacantism and have some overlap, but do not hold to the sedevacantist line and write articles in their journals critiquing it.

In the aftermath of the canonical visitation to the International Seminary of Saint Pius X in 1974, which led to the Vatican's withdrawal of the SSPX's "pious union" status, individual sedevacantists were tolerated and Archbishop Lefebvre stated to Cardinal Giovanni Benelli in 1976 after his suspension a divinis, "The post-Concillar Church is a schismatic Church, since it has broken with the Catholic Church that has always been", without explicitly saying that Paul VI was not the Pope.

== See also ==
- Cum ex apostolatus officio
- Independent Catholicism
- Integralism
- List of movements that dispute the legitimacy of a reigning monarch
- Apostolic succession
