= Congregation of Mary Immaculate Queen =

Sedevacantist organization

- Congregatio Mariae Reginae Immaculatae
- Abbreviation: CMRI
- Formation: 1967; 59 years ago
- Type: Sedevacantist Catholic religious congregation
- Headquarters: Omaha, Nebraska, U.S.
- Members: 1 bishop; 66 priests (including close affiliations); 23 seminarians; 4 brothers; 50 sisters
- Superior General: Mark Pivarunas
- Key people: Francis Schuckardt (founder); Denis Chicoine; M. Benedict Hughes; Casimir M. Puskorius; Mark Pivarunas (current Superior General and bishop)
- Website: cmri.org

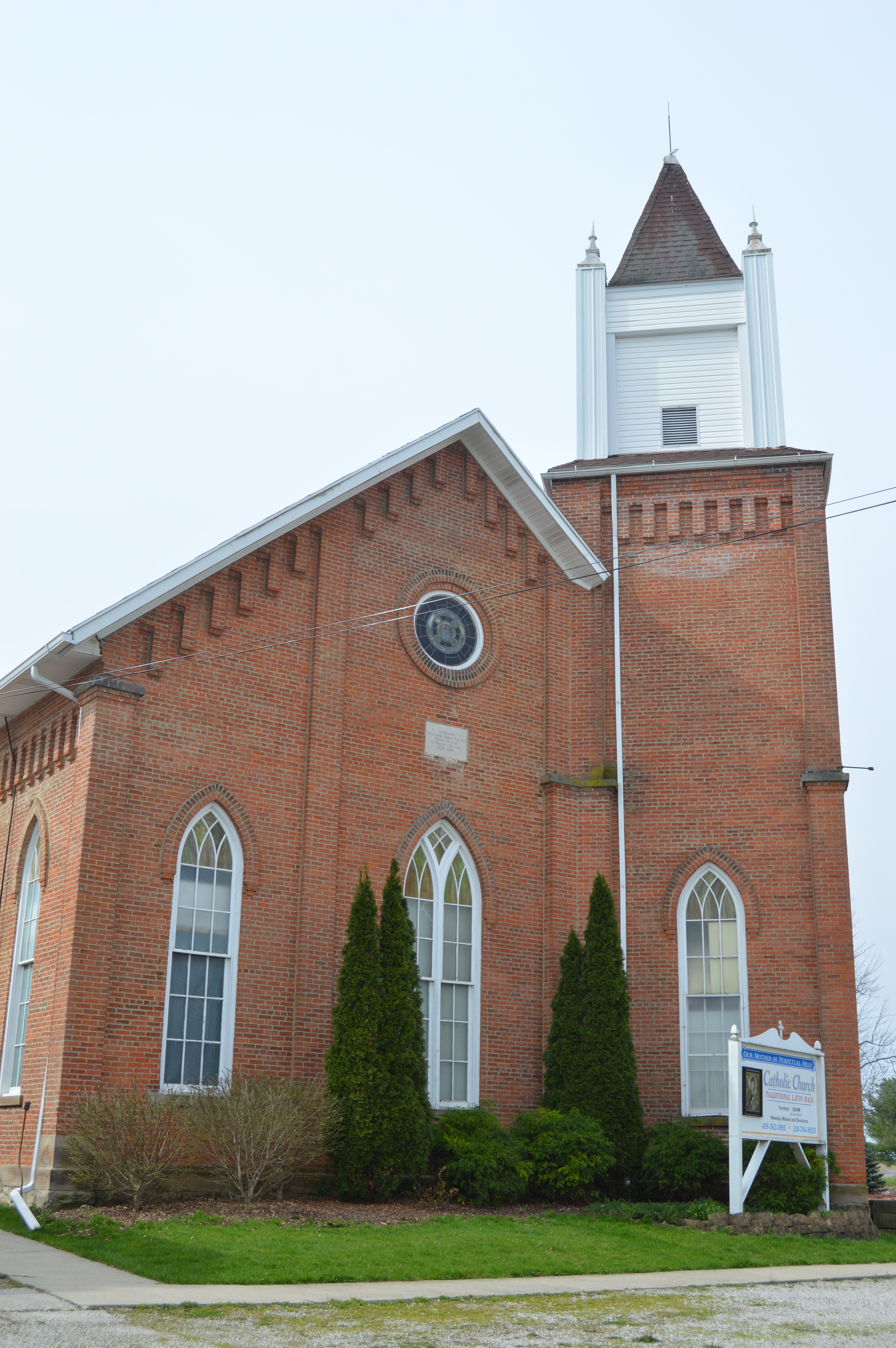
Our Mother of Perpetual Help Church: CMRI church in Sulphur Springs, Ohio, United States

The Congregation of Mary Immaculate Queen (Latin: Congregatio Mariae Reginae Immaculatae; CMRI) is a sedevacantist traditionalist Catholic religious congregation that is not in communion with the Holy See. The CMRI is dedicated to promoting the message of Our Lady of Fátima and the devotion of the practice of Total Consecration to the Virgin Mary as taught by Saint Louis Marie de Montfort. The CMRI was founded by Francis Schuckardt, but he was later expelled from the organisation due to allegations of sexual abuse and drug use.

The congregation lists over 90 traditional Catholic churches and chapels both in the United States and abroad, as well as at least 13 schools staffed by religious.

== Alternative names ==
The group has used and was designated by various other names including:

- Fatima Crusade
- Tridentine Latin Rite Church
- Oblates of Mary Immaculate
- Fatima Crusaders

== Superiors Generals ==
- Francis Schuckardt (1967–1984)
- Denis Chicoine (1984–1989)
- Mark Pivarunas (1989–1991)
- Casimir M. Puskorius (1991–1995)
- Mark Pivarunas (1995–present)

== Activities ==
The Sisters at Mount Saint Michael record CDs and perform an annual Christmas concert.

The CMRI hold the Fatima Conference at Mount Saint Michael in Spokane, Washington every October. The Conference includes five days of lectures, daily Mass, devotions, and meals.

The CMRI has been involved with mass media since their founding as a method of recruitment and information. Throughout their history, the CMRI has produced books, pamphlets, and audio recordings. The CMRI runs a bookstore, Mary Immaculate Queen Center, and produces various periodicals: The Reign of Mary (quarterly magazine), Adsum (Mater Dei seminary monthly newsletter), and Anima Mariae, the CMRI sisters' newsletter. The CMRI also produces CDs of the annual Fatima Conference talks, as well as a livestream of Daily Mass and devotions from the City of Mary in Rathdrum, Idaho.

== History ==
=== Speaking tours and Coeur d'Alene beginnings (1967 to 1971) ===
Francis Schuckardt and Robert Chicoine (a former Marine, bricklayer, and newspaper pressman from New Bedford, Massachusetts) attracted followers through international speaking tours as part of the Blue Army of Our Lady of Fatima. Chicoine first heard Schuckardt in a 1965 talk in San Diego about the message of Fatima. After listening to Schuckardt for three nights in a row, he became his disciple.

In 1971, Schuckardt changed the name of the group to Traditional Latin Rite Catholic Church.

By 1984, the CMRI owned and operated schools, camps, and properties, including a convent and girls high school in Colbert, Washington and a mansion at 2314 E South Altamont Boulevard in Spokane, Washington, which operated as the priory and Schuckardt's main residence.

=== Chicoine era (1984 to 1989) ===
In 1984, Chicoine accused Schuckardt of abuse and drug addiction., and Schuckardt and a small group of his followers were expelled from the CMRI and left the Spokane area, taking the name Tridentine Latin Rite Church. In addition to Alphonsus, Schuckardt was followed by 4 religious sisters and 10 religious clerics and brothers. A larger group of the priests, religious, and laity remained with Chicoine at Mount Saint Michael, retaining the CMRI name and the bulk of the church property. Local media in 1984 reported that there were 5,000 followers of the group in the United States, 800 of whom live in the Spokane area. By 1986, local media reported about half the members of the church's religious orders left.

Following the expulsion of Schuckardt, sedevacantist Bishop George Musey (of the Thục apostolic line) conditionally re-administered the sacraments imparted by Schuckardt, whose validity was now considered dubious, and conditionally re-ordained the remaining priests.

In 1986, the Congregation held its first General Chapter, which established its rule and constitutions, that were later approved by sedevacantist Bishop Robert McKenna ORCM.

=== Pivarunas era (since 1989) ===
In August 1989, Father Tarcisius Pivarunas (Mark Pivarunas) was elected Superior General of the congregation.

On 1 February 1991, sedevacantist Bishop Moisés Carmona expressed his desire to consecrate as bishop whomever the congregation chose. On 3 April 1991, Pivarunas was elected to be consecrated a bishop. Pivarunas dropped his religious name, "Tarcisius", and in accordance with CMRI Constitutions, resigned as Superior General. He was succeeded by Father Casimir M. Puskorius. On 24 September 1991, in Mount Saint Michael, Pivarunas was consecrated a bishop by Bishop Carmona.

In June 2007, 15 sisters (including Rev. Mother Ludmilla) living at Mount Saint Michael in Spokane were expelled for disputing the CMRI stance of sedevacantism. They later reunited with the Catholic Church, and formed the Sisters of Mary, Mother of the Church (SMMC) under the authority of William Skylstad, Bishop of Spokane.

In 2016, Pivarunas administered the sacrament of confirmation to 20 people in Paese, during a Mass presided by Father Florian Abrahamowicz. The Diocese of Treviso declared the confirmations to be "valid but illicit".

== Criticism ==
In 1986, Jim Sparks of the Spokesman-Review Spokane Chronicle wrote a front page article "Tranquility returns to Tridentines" describing abuse and controversies occurring within the CMIQ. These included:

- In 1981, the Nebraska Supreme Court gave Dennis Burnham custody of his daughter because of his wife's involvement with the church, not based on religious affiliation per se but due to concerns about the daughter's welfare.
- Fr. Chicoine shaved (or cropped) the front part of a girl's hair for explaining to a friend the meaning of a menstrual period and the meaning of a common obscene gesture.
- A teaching nun gave a child a black eye and swollen face when the child refused to eat their own vomit.
- A 16-year-old was punished by being ordered to crawl across a parking lot and up a flight of stairs to a chapel on his bare knees, leading to damaged cartilage.

In 2006, the Southern Poverty Law Center designated Mount St. Michael one of twelve "anti-semitic radical traditionalist Catholic groups." The 2021 list no longer included Mt. St. Michael.

In December 2018, a priest was accused of ritual sexual abuse of a child at the Holy Innocents Catholic School in Waite Park, MN in the 1970s and 1980s.
