= Blaise Kurz =

German Catholic bishop

Blaise Sigibald Kurz O.F.M.
- Prefect of Lingling
- Church: Catholic Church
- See: Apostolic Prefecture of Lingling
- In office: 21 May 1948 – 13 December 1973
- Predecessor: Vinzenz Maria Demetz
- Other post: Titular Bishop of Terenuthis (1939-1973)
- Previous posts: Vicar Apostolic of Kokstad (1939-1948); Prefect of Mount Currie (1935-1939)

Orders
- Ordination: 21 December 1919 by Dionysius Schuler
- Consecration: 29 October 1939 by Pope Pius XII

Personal details
- Born: 3 February 1894 Sontheim, Kingdom of Bavaria, German Empire
- Died: 13 December 1973 (aged 79) Waldsassen, Bavaria, West Germany

Blaise Sigibald Kurz (3 February 1894 in Sontheim – 13 December 1973 in Waldsassen) was a German Catholic bishop and a member of the Order of Friars Minor (Franciscans). In the aftermath of the Second Vatican Council, Bishop Kurz was a traditionalist Catholic voice.

== Biography ==
Sigebald (also: Sigibald) Kurz entered the Bavarian province of the Franciscan order in 1914 and received the religious name Blasius (also: Blaise). On 21 December 1919, he was ordained a priest of the Catholic Church by Cardinal Michael von Faulhaber, Archbishop of Bavaria. From 1923 he worked as a missionary in China for ten years.

On 11 July 1939, he was appointed Vicar Apostolic of Kokstad (South Africa) where he worked among the deaf and the mute. On 29 October 1939 in Rome he was personally ordained by Pope Pius XII as titular bishop of Terenuthis, along with co-consecrators Archbishops Celso Constantini and Henri Streicher at St. Peter's Basilica. In 1946 he resigned from his position as Vicar Apostolic and returned to Germany. On 21 May 1948, he was appointed Apostolic Prefect of Yongzhou (Lingling) in China, but was soon prevented from exercising his office by the Chinese communists of Mao Zedong and, like all foreign missionaries, was expelled from China.

From 1949 he is documented as Blaise S. Kurz in the United States, where he looked after Catholic refugees from China: he was invited there by Cardinal Francis Spellman in the Archdiocese of New York. From 1962 to 1965 he attended the Second Vatican Council, with Fr. Gommar DePauw attending as his peritus. A conservative at the Council, he was a strong supporter of Cardinal Alfredo Ottaviani and pushed back against Cardinal Josef Frings who told him to "fall in line" with the liberal-leaning Rhileland Alliance. Kurz tried in vain to win Cardinal Leo Joseph Suenens over to the conservative side, asking him to "come back to the Faith and leave those lousy traitors". He stayed at the guest house of the Sisters of Notre Dame on Villa Maria Regina, during the Council.

Wounded by the outcome of the Second Vatican Council, he became bishop-moderator of the Catholic Traditionalist Movement created in 1964 and supported its founder, the Belgian priest Fr. Gommar DePauw in the fight for the preservation of the Traditional Latin Mass. He stood with Fr. DePauw when the liberal Cardinal Lawrence Shehan of Baltimore moved to suppress the CTM. In 1967, DePauw requested that Kurz petition Pope Paul VI, ultimately in vain, for permission to ordain American traditionalists as bishops.

In 1969 Kurz returned to Germany and worked as a pastor in the St. Martin retirement home in Waldsassen (Upper Palatinate). A few months before his death, on 21 September 1973, Kurz ordained conservative German theologian Günther Storck as a priest in Egg, Switzerland, who later joined first Archbishop Marcel Lefebvre (founder of the Society of St. Pius X) and then Fr. Michel-Louis Guérard des Lauriers. As early as 1970, Kurz had ordained the Swiss traditionalist Felix C. Jeker (1944–1990) as a priest in his nominally still-existing apostolic prefecture, who received his doctorate in canon law from the Angelicum as its priest.

Kurz was buried in the Franciscan burial site in Nuremberg's southern cemetery.

== See also ==
- Catholic Church in Germany
- Catholic Church in South Africa
- Catholic Church in China

== External sources ==
- Eberhard Heller: H. E. Mgr. Blasius Sigebald Kurz O.F.M. died thirty years ago. In: Insight 33, 9 (2003) 302.
- Oskar Schmitt: A worthy steward in the vineyard of our Lord Jesus Christ: Bishop Pierre Martin Ngo-dinh-Thuc. Books on Demand GmbH 2006, 186f. ISBN 978-3833453854
