= Michel-Louis Guérard des Lauriers =

French sedeprivationist bishop and theologian (1898–1988)

His Excellency Michel-Louis Guérard des Lauriers

Orders
- Ordination: 29 July 1931
- Consecration: 7 May 1981 by Ngô Đình Thục

Personal details
- Born: 25 October 1898 France
- Died: 27 February 1988 (aged 89) Cosne-sur-Loire, France
- Buried: Raveau, France
- Profession: Clergyman; lecturer; theologian

Ordination history of Michel-Louis Guérard des Lauriers
History
Priestly ordination
- Date: 29 July 1931
Episcopal consecration
- Consecrated by: Ngô Đình Thục
- Date: 7 May 1981
- Place: Toulon, France
Episcopal succession
Bishops consecrated by Michel-Louis Guérard des Lauriers as principal consecrator
- Günther Storck: 30 April 1984
- Robert McKenna: 22 August 1986

Michel-Louis Guérard des Lauriers (25 October 1898 – 27 February 1988) was a French Catholic clergyman and theologian who was a member of the Dominican Order but was eventually excommunicated from the Catholic Church. He was involved in contemporary traditionalist Catholicism, both in France and the wider world, especially in support of the Tridentine Mass. An early adopter of sedevacantism, a theory claiming that Pope Paul VI was not a legitimate Pope, he changed his position by 1979, creating a new theory known as sedeprivationism. Also called the Cassiacum Thesis, it is sometimes considered adjacent to or a sub-set of sedevacantism.

Ordained to the priesthood in 1931, he was a Thomist theologian in France and was noted for his involvement in preparatory work for the dogmatic definition of the Assumption of Mary, officially defined and proclaimed as infallible doctrine by Pope Pius XII in 1950. He was involved in the theological controversies of the time and was an opponent of the emerging Nouvelle théologie, particularly against Pierre Teilhard de Chardin and Henri de Lubac. During the early 1960s, he was a lecturer at the Pontifical Lateran University in Rome and a member of the Pontifical Academy of Saint Thomas Aquinas.

Concerned with the changes associated with the Second Vatican Council and the introduction of the New Order of Mass, he was one of the writers of the Short Critical Study of the Novus Ordo Missae in 1969 (also known as the Ottaviani Intervention), which the Cardinals Alfredo Ottaviani and Antonio Bacci sent to Paul VI, requesting clarification. This became a rallying point for those who opposed these changes.

In 1971, he became a professor of theology at the Society of St. Pius X's International Seminary at Écône. In 1981, he was consecrated a bishop by Archbishop Ngô Đình Thục, Titular Archbishop of Bulla Regia, a Vietnamese clergyman of the Roman Catholic Church. The Vatican's Sacred Congregation for the Doctrine of the Faith judged in 1983 that he had incurred "ipso facto excommunication" as a consequence. Regardless, Guérard des Lauriers himself later consecrated as bishops two priest who also endorsed sedeprivationism; Günther Storck and Robert McKenna.

== Early life and career ==
Michel-Louis Guérard des Lauriers was born near Paris, France, on 25 October 1898.

In 1921, he entered the Scuola Normale Superiore. He studied for two years in Rome, with Professor Tullio Levi-Civita. He was a normalien and agrégé in mathematics.

In 1925, he entered the Order of Preachers. He entered the Dominican novitiate of Amiens in 1927. He made his profession in 1930.

== Priesthood ==
In 1933, he became a professor of philosophy at the Dominican school of theology Le Saulchoir, in Belgium. In 1940, he received a doctorate in mathematics with thesis Sur les systèmes différentiels du second ordre qui admettent un groupe continu fini de transformations.

He served as a professor at the Pontifical Lateran University in Rome. Following the introduction of the New Order of Mass to replace the Traditional Latin Mass in 1969, Guérard des Lauriers was involved in writing the Short Critical Study of the Novus Ordo Missae, also known as the Ottaviani Intervention, named for Cardinal Alfredo Ottaviani.

== Sedeprivationism ==
Des Lauriers supported the belief that the current state of the papacy, based on Pope Paul VI allegedly teaching heresy in the context of the Magisterium, was that Paul VI could not be a true pope, being only pope materially and not formally. This position is known as sedeprivationism, or the "Thesis of Cassiciacum," which he first articulated in 1979 in an article entitled "Le Siége apostolique est-il vacant?" ("The Apostolic See: is it Vacant?"). This addressed the question of sedevacantism which had been raised by the Mexican priest Fr. Joaquín Sáenz y Arriaga and his supporters some years earlier.

== Episcopacy and excommunication ==
On 7 May 1981, Guérard des Lauriers was privately consecrated a bishop in Toulon, France, by Ngô Đình Thục, Titular Archbishop of Bulla Regia, a Vietnamese clergyman of the Roman Catholic Church who had begun to associate with sedevacantism. This was done without the permission of Pope John Paul II, who Guérard des Lauriers did not recognize as a true pope. On 12 March 1983, the Vatican, through its representative Joseph Ratzinger, prefect of the Sacred Congregation for the Doctrine of the Faith published a notification that the bishops consecrated by Archbishop Thục without John Paul II's permission had incurred "ipso facto, excommunication most specially reserved to the Apostolic See".

Guérard des Lauriers nonetheless purported to consecrate at least two bishops: Günther Storck (a German) on 30 April 1984, and Robert McKenna (an American) on 22 August 1986.

== Death and legacy ==
Some leaders of anti-Modernist Catholic movements adhere to his theory of sedeprivationism, including Bishop Geert Stuyver (a Belgian) of the Istituto Mater Boni Consilii (IMBC), Bishops Donald Sanborn, Joseph Selway, and Germán Fliess of the Roman Catholic Institute (RCI), and Bishop Robert Neville, potentially among others.

== Writings ==
- Le Saint-Esprit, âme de l'Eglise, Étiolles, Seine et Oise : Monastère de la Croix, 1948.
- Garabandal, S.l., 1965.
- Lettera ad un religioso di Simone Weil; trad. di Mariella Bettarini. Risposta alla Lettera ad un religioso di Guérard des Lauriers; trad. di Carmen Montesano (Lettre à un religieux), Torino : Borla, 1970.
- La Mathématique, les mathématiques, la mathématique moderne, Paris : Doin, 1972.
- Homélie (prononcée le 15 mai 1971 pour l'anniversaire de la mort de l'amiral de Penfentenyo de Kervéréguin), Versailles : R.O.C., 1973.
- La Charité de la vérité, Villegenon : Sainte Jeanne d'Arc, 1985.
- La Présence réelle du Verbe incarné dans les espèces consacrées, Villegenon : Sainte Jeanne d'Arc, 1987.
