= Hochstetten =

Hochstetten may refer to:

- Hochstetten (Argenbühl), a locality in the municipality of Argenbühl, Baden-Württemberg, Germany
- Hochstetten (Breisach), a locality in the municipality of Breisach, Baden-Württemberg, Germany
- Hochstetten (Linkenheim-Hochstetten), a locality in the municipality of Linkenheim-Hochstetten, Baden-Württemberg, Germany
- Hochstetten (Sontheim), a locality in the municipality of Sontheim, Bavaria, Germany
- Hochstetten (Hochstetten-Dhaun), a locality in the municipality of Hochstetten-Dhaun, Rhineland-Palatinate, Germany

== See also ==
- Höchstetten (disambiguation)
