= Roman Missal =

Central book of the most widespread Catholic liturgical rite

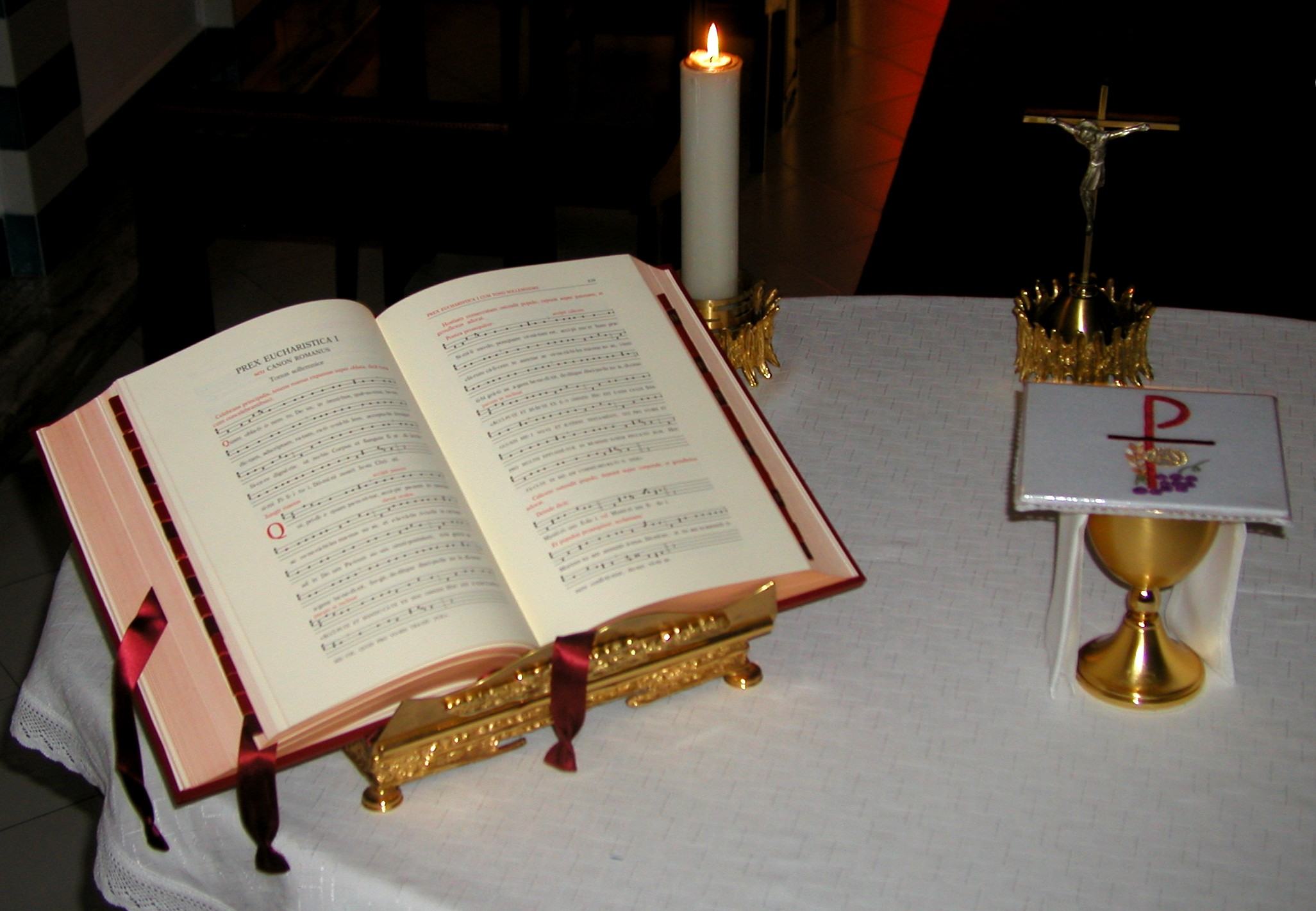
2002 edition of the Missale Romanum

The Roman Missal (Latin: Missale Romanum) is the title of several missals used in the celebration of the Roman Rite. Along with other liturgical books of the Roman Rite, the Roman Missal contains the texts and rubrics for the celebration of the most common liturgy and Mass of the Catholic Church.

== History ==
=== Before the Council of Trent (1570) ===
Before the high Middle Ages, several books were used at Mass: a Sacramentary with the prayers, one or more books for the Scriptural readings, and one or more books for the antiphons and other chants. Gradually, manuscripts came into being that incorporated parts of more than one of these books, leading finally to versions that were complete in themselves. Such a book was referred to as a Missale Plenum (English: "Full Missal").

As early as the late 7th century, the recurring parts of the Roman Mass became compiled into a new type of liturgical text titled Ordo Missae (Order of Mass), a separate section in sacramentaries which instructed on "How the Roman Mass is to be celebrated" (Qualiter missa romana caelebratur), following the description in Ordo Romanus I. From the 9th century, these Ordo texts — which appeared as part of missals as well as priestly handbooks or prayer books — flourished in variety and content, particularly in the Frankish Kingdom and along the Rhine. Going beyond earlier types of liturgical writing, they incorporated ritual instructions and private prayers for the celebrant to recite as an aid to the devout offering of sacrifice. These private prayers distinctively included prayers directly addressed to Christ and direct invocations of the Holy Trinity (such as during the Offertory) — Gallican responses against Arianism among Germanic peoples. The prayers also reflected a Frankish tendency to verbalise non-verbal gestures. By the reign of Gregory VII, such Rhenish elements had become integral to the rite of the Pope and the Papal Curia, at the same time that the Roman Church began encouraging liturgical unity across Western Christendom.

In 1223 Saint Francis of Assisi instructed his friars to adopt the form that was in use at the Papal Court (Rule, chapter 3). They adapted this missal further to the needs of their largely itinerant apostolate. Pope Gregory IX considered, but did not put into effect, the idea of extending this missal, as revised by the Franciscans, to the whole Western Church; and in 1277 Pope Nicholas III ordered it to be accepted in all churches in the city of Rome. Its use spread throughout Europe, especially after the invention of the printing press; but the editors introduced variations of their own choosing, some of them substantial. Printing also favoured the spread of other liturgical texts of less certain orthodoxy. The Council of Trent determined that an end must be put to the resulting disparities.

The Papal Curia chapel missal used during Innocent III's papacy was largely reproduced in the Franciscan Missal, which in turn was adopted by Pope Nicholas for the Roman Missal. The later Roman Missal of 1474, which replicates the papal chapel missal of the 1200s, "hardly differs at all" from the Tridentine Missal promulgated in 1570.

The first printed Missale Romanum (Roman Missal), containing the Ordo Missalis secundum consuetudinem Curiae Romanae (Order of the Missal in accordance with the custom of the Roman Curia), was produced in Milan in 1474. Almost a whole century passed before the appearance of an edition officially published by order of the Holy See. During that interval, the 1474 Milanese edition was followed by at least 14 other editions: 10 printed in Venice, 3 in Paris, 1 in Lyon. For lack of a controlling authority, these editions differ, sometimes considerably.

Annotations in the hand of Cardinal Gugliemo Sirleto in a copy of the 1494 Venetian edition show that it was used for drawing up the 1570 official edition of Pope Pius V. In substance, this 1494 text is identical with that of the 1474 Milanese edition.

In the 1500s, the Pre-Tridentine Roman Rite became the basis for Evangelical-Lutheran Rite of the Mass.

=== From 1570 to the 1960s ===
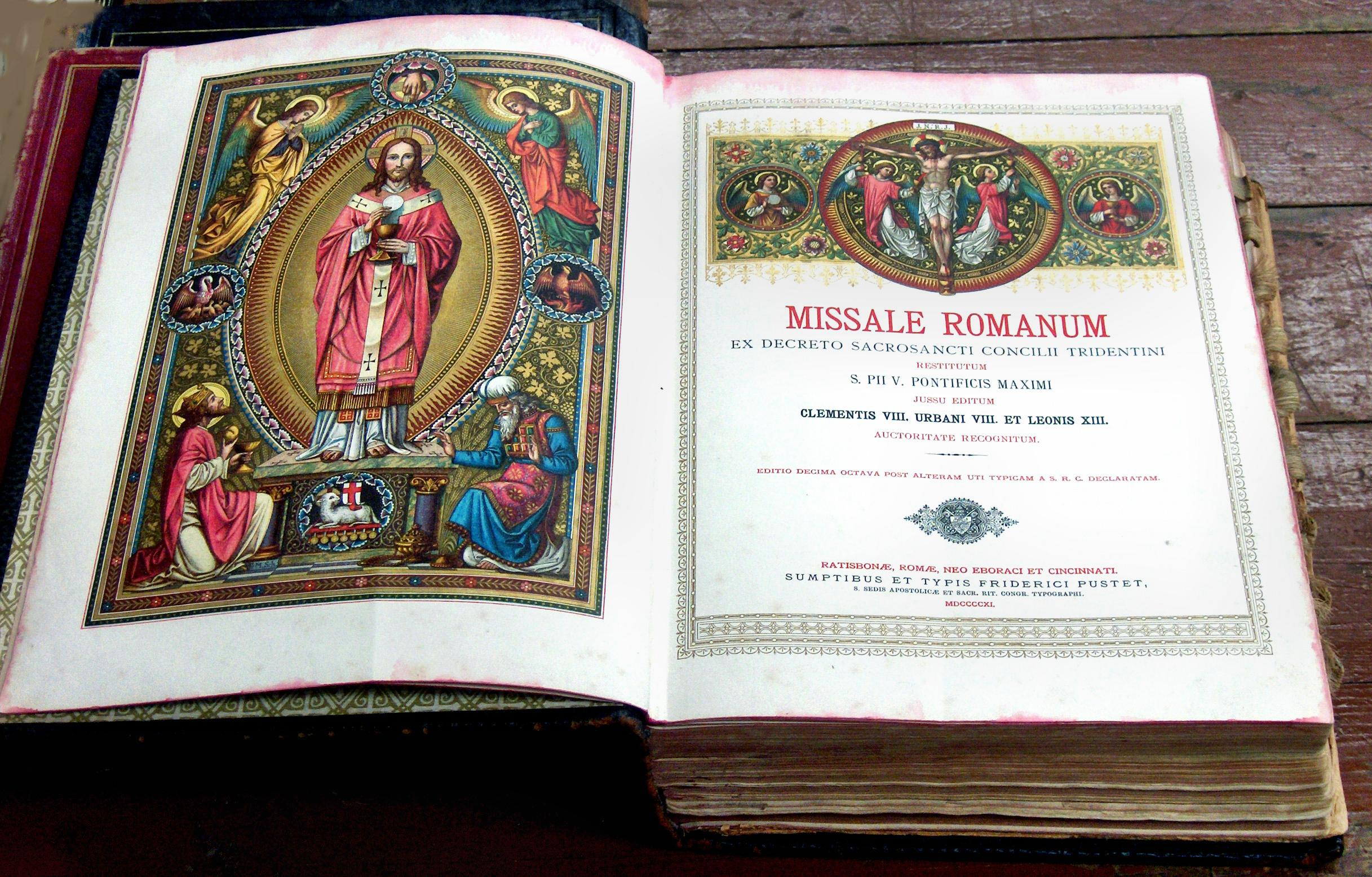
"Missale Romanum": a 1911 printing of the 1884 typical edition

Implementing the decision of the Council of Trent, Pope Pius V promulgated, in the Apostolic Constitution Quo primum of 14 July 1570, an edition of the Roman Missal that was mandated for obligatory use throughout the Latin Church except where there was another liturgical rite that could be proven to have been in use for at least two centuries.

Some corrections to Pope Pius V's text proved necessary, and Pope Clement VIII replaced it with a new typical edition of the Roman Missal on 7 July 1604. (In this context, the word "typical" means that the text is the one to which all other printings must conform.) A further revised typical edition was promulgated by Pope Urban VIII on 2 September 1634.

Beginning in the late seventeenth century, France and neighbouring areas saw a flurry of independent missals published by bishops. Some of these were editions of manuscript missals already existing prior to 1370, but had undergone modifications that in some cases touched on the arbitrary. Later accusations of influence by Jansenism and Gallicanism were largely unfounded, as is shown by the fact that the Holy See did never condemned these books. This historical phenomenon of diocesan missals ended, however, when Abbot Guéranger and bishops such as Bishop Pierre-Louis Parisis of Langres initiated in the nineteenth century a vigorous polemical campaign in favour of a return to the Roman Missal. By 1875 all the French dioceses were using the Roman Missal. In 1884, Pope Leo XIII promulgated a new typical edition that took account of all the changes introduced since the time of Pope Urban VIII. Pope Pius X also undertook a revision of the Roman Missal, which was promulgated and declared typical by his successor Pope Benedict XV on 25 July 1920.

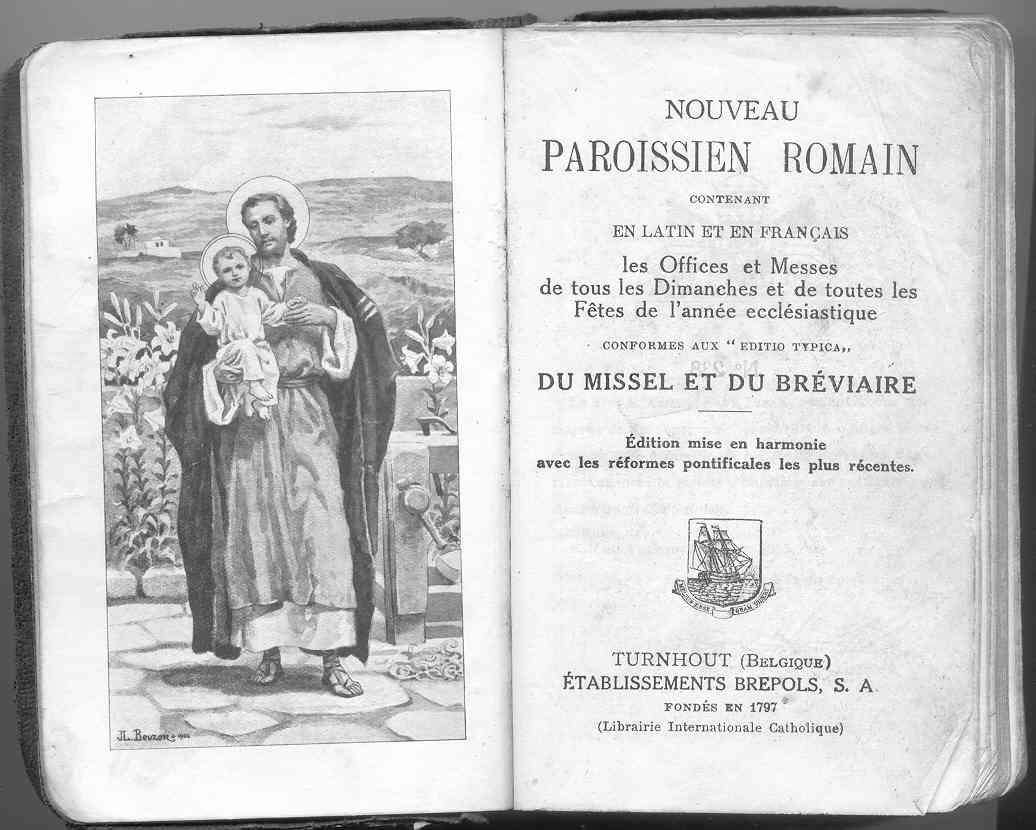
A French prayerbook of 1905 containing extracts from the Roman Missal and the Roman Breviary of the time with French translations

Though Pope Pius X's revision made few corrections, omissions, and additions to the text of the prayers in the Roman Missal, there were major changes in the rubrics, changes which were not incorporated in the section entitled "Rubricae generales", but were instead printed as an additional section under the heading "Additiones et variationes in rubricis Missalis."

Pope Pius XII issued no new typical edition of the Roman Missal, but authorized experimentally in 1951 the replacement of revised texts for Palm Sunday, Holy Thursday, Good Friday, and the Easter Vigil. After positive reports from the world's bishops, these changes were made universally obligatory in 1955. The Pope also removed from the Vigil of Pentecost the series of six Old Testament readings, with their accompanying Tracts and Collects, but these continued to be printed until 1962.

Acceding to the wishes of many of the bishops, Pope Pius XII judged it expedient also to reduce the rubrics of the missal to a simpler form, a simplification enacted by a decree of the Sacred Congregation of Rites of 23 March 1955. The changes this made in the General Roman Calendar are indicated in General Roman Calendar of Pope Pius XII.

In the following year, 1956, while preparatory studies were being conducted for a general liturgical reform, Pope Pius XII surveyed the opinions of the bishops on the liturgical improvement of the Roman breviary. After duly weighing the answers of the bishops, he judged that it was time to address the need for a general and systematic revision of the rubrics of the breviary and missal. This question he referred to the special committee of experts appointed to study the general liturgical reform.

His successor, Pope John XXIII, issued a new typical edition of the Roman Missal in 1962. This incorporated the revised Code of Rubrics which Pope Pius XII's commission had prepared, and which Pope John XXIII had made obligatory with effect from 1 January 1961. In the Missal, this Code of Rubrics replaced two of the documents in the 1920 edition; and the Pope's motu proprio Rubricarum instructum took the place of the superseded Apostolic constitution Divino afflatu of Pope Pius X.

Other notable changes incorporated were the omission of the adjective "perfidis" in the Good Friday Prayer for the Jews and the insertion of the name of Saint Joseph into the Canon (or Eucharistic Prayer) of the Mass.

=== Revision following the Second Vatican Council ===
In 1965 and 1967 some changes were officially introduced into the Mass of the Roman Rite in the wake of Sacrosanctum Concilium, but no new edition of the Roman Missal had been produced to incorporate them. They were reflected in the provisional vernacular translations produced in various countries when the language of the people began to be used in addition to Latin. References sometimes met in an English-language context to "the 1965 Missal" concern these temporary vernacular productions, not the Roman Missal itself. Some countries that had the same language used different translations and varied in the amount of vernacular admitted.

A new edition of the Roman Missal was promulgated by Pope Paul VI with the apostolic constitution Missale Romanum of 3 April 1969. The full text of the revised Missal was not published until the following year, and full vernacular translations appeared some years later, but parts of the Missal in Latin were already available since 1964 in non-definitive form, and provisional translations appeared without delay.

In his apostolic constitution, Pope Paul VI made particular mention of the following significant changes that he had made in the Roman Missal:

- To the single Eucharistic Prayer of the previous edition (which, with minor alterations, was preserved as the First Eucharistic Prayer) he added three alternative Eucharistic Prayers, increasing also the number of prefaces.
- The rites of the Order of Mass (in Latin, Ordo Missae) — that is, the largely unvarying part of the liturgy — were "simplified, while due care is taken to preserve their substance." "Elements which, with the passage of time, came to be duplicated, or were added with but little advantage" were eliminated, especially in the rites for the preparation of the bread and wine, the breaking of the bread, and Communion.
- "'Other elements which have suffered injury through accidents of history are now to be restored to the earlier norm of the Holy Fathers' (Sacrosanctum Concilium, art. 50), for example, the homily (see Sacrosanctum Concilium, art. 52) and the 'common prayer' or 'prayer of the faithful' (see Sacrosanctum Concilium, art. 53)." Paul VI also added the option of "a penitential rite or act of reconciliation with God and the brothers, at the beginning of the Mass", though this was neither an ancient part of the Introductory Rite nor mentioned in Sacrosanctum Concilium.
- He greatly increased the proportion of the Bible read at Mass. Even before Pius XII reduced the proportion further, only 1% of the Old Testament and 16.5% of the New Testament was read at Mass. In Pope Paul's revision, 13.5% of the Old Testament and 71.5% of the New Testament are read. He was able to do this by having more readings at Mass and introducing a three-year cycle of readings on Sundays and a two-year cycle on weekdays.

In addition to these changes, the Pope noted that his revision considerably modified other sections of the Missal, such as the Proper of Seasons, the Proper of Saints, the Common of Saints, the Ritual Masses, and the Votive Masses, adding: "In all of these changes, particular care has been taken with the prayers: not only has their number been increased, so that the new texts might better correspond to new needs, but also their text has been restored on the testimony of the most ancient evidences."

=== Editions after the Second Vatican Council ===
In 1970, the first typical edition of the Roman Missal (in Latin) bearing the title Missale Romanum ex decreto Sacrosancti Oecumenici Concilii Vaticani II instauratum was published, after being formally promulgated by Pope Paul VI in the previous year. A reprint that corrected misprints appeared in 1971. A second typical edition, with minor changes, followed in 1975. In 2000, Pope John Paul II approved a third typical edition, which appeared in 2002. This third edition added feasts, especially of some recently canonized saints, new prefaces of the Eucharistic Prayers, and additional Masses and prayers for various needs, and it revised and amplified the General Instruction of the Roman Missal.

In 2008, under Pope Benedict XVI, an emended reprint of the third edition was issued, correcting misprints and some other mistakes (such as the insertion at the beginning of the Apostles' Creed of "unum", as in the Nicene Creed). A supplement gives celebrations, such as that of Saint Pio of Pietrelcina, added to the General Roman Calendar after the initial printing of the 2002 typical edition.

Three alterations required personal approval by Pope Benedict XVI:

- A change in the order in which a bishop celebrating Mass outside his own diocese mentions the local bishop and himself
- Omission from the Roman Missal of the special Eucharistic Prayers for Masses with Children (which, however, were not thereby suppressed)
- The addition of three alternatives to the standard dismissal at the end of Mass, Ite, missa est (Go forth, the Mass is ended):
  - Ite ad Evangelium Domini annuntiandum (Go and announce the Gospel of the Lord)
  - Ite in pace, glorificando vita vestra Dominum (Go in peace, glorifying the Lord by your life)
  - Ite in pace (Go in peace)

Pope John XXIII's 1962 edition of the Roman Missal began a period of aesthetic preference for a reduced number of illustrations in black and white instead of the many brightly coloured pictures previously included. The first post-Vatican II editions, both in the original Latin and in translation, continued that tendency. The first Latin edition (1970) had in all 12 black-and-white woodcut illustrations by Gian Luigi Uboldi. The 1974 English translation adopted by the United States episcopal conference appear in several printings. Our Sunday Visitor printed it with further illustrations by Uboldi, while the printing by Catholic Book Publishing Corp. had woodcuts in colour. The German editions of 1975 and 1984 had no illustrations, thus emphasizing the clarity and beauty of the typography. The French editions of 1974 and 1978 were also without illustrations, while the Italian editions of 1973 and 1983 contained both reproductions of miniatures in an 11th-century manuscript and stylized figures whose appropriateness is doubted by the author of a study on the subject, who also makes a similar observation about the illustrations in the Spanish editions of 1978 and 1988. The minimalist presentation in these editions contrasts strongly with the opulence of United States editions of the period between 2005 and 2011 with their many full-colour reproductions of paintings and other works of art.

The first vernacular version of the third edition (2002) of the Vatican II Roman Missal to be published was that in Greek. It appeared in 2006. The English translation, taking into account the 2008 changes, came into use in 2011. Translations into some other languages took longer: that into Italian was decided on by the Episcopal Conference of Italy at its November 2018 meeting and was confirmed by the Holy See in the following year, as announced by the conference's president at its 22 May 2019 meeting. It replaces the 1983 Italian translation of the 1975 second Latin edition. The new text includes changes to the Italian Lord's Prayer and Gloria. In the Lord's Prayer, e non c'indurre in tentazione ("and lead us not into temptation") becomes non abbandonarci alla tentazione ("do not abandon us to temptation") and come noi li rimettiamo ai nostri debitori ("as we forgive our debtors") becomes come anche noi li rimettiamo ai nostri debitori ("as we too forgive our debtors"). In the Gloria pace in terra agli uomini di buona volontà ("peace on earth to people of good will") becomes pace in terra agli uomini, amati dal Signore ("peace on earth to people, who are loved by the Lord").

=== Continued use of earlier editions ===
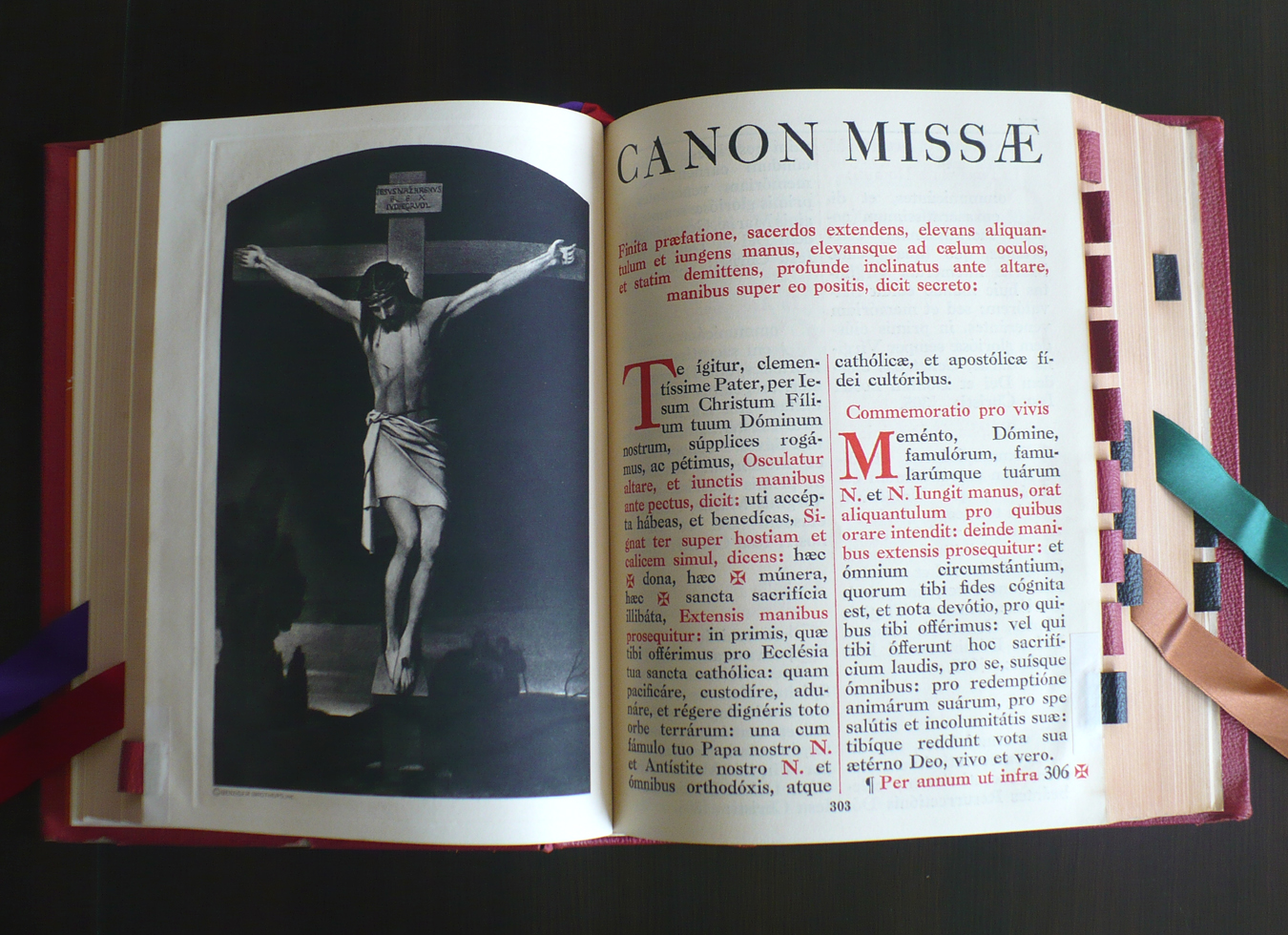
1962 edition of the Missale Romanum

In his motu proprio Summorum Pontificum of 7 July 2007, Pope Benedict XVI stated that the 1962 edition of the Roman Missal was never juridically abrogated and that it may be freely used by any priest of the Latin Church when celebrating Mass "without a congregation". Use of the 1962 edition at Mass with a congregation is allowed, with the permission of the priest in charge of a church, for stable groups attached to this earlier form of the Roman Rite, provided that the priest using it is "qualified to do so and not juridically impeded" (as for instance by suspension). Accordingly, many dioceses schedule regular Masses celebrated using the 1962 edition. Since the main difference between the 1962 Missal and prior editions is the liturgy for Holy Week, the church has permitted Tridentine Mass parishes to adopt earlier editions of the Roman Missal published just prior to the 1962 edition.

In 2021, Pope Francis, motivated by a desire to stave off what he perceived to be growing rejection of the Second Vatican Council developing from groups using the preconciliar rites, issued Traditionis custodes to restore the previous status quo of bishops having authority over the celebrations of Mass in the preconciliar Roman Rite. Francis stated in the letter that the current version of the Roman Rite ought to be regarded as the "unique expression of [its] lex orandi."

Several traditionalist fraternities in full communion with the Holy See are authorised to celebrate the Mass exclusively according to the 1962 version of the Missal: such groups include the Priestly Fraternity of Saint Peter (FSSP), the Institute of Christ the King Sovereign Priest (ICKSP), the Personal Apostolic Administration of Saint John Mary Vianney and the Institute of the Good Shepherd.

The Society of Saint Pius X (FSSPX), which rejects the reforms of the Second Vatican Council and is not in full communion with the Holy See, exclusively celebrates the Mass according to the 1962 version of the Roman Missal. Sedevacantist and sedeprivationist groups, which reject the Council and do not recognise the current Pope as valid, also reject the 1962 version of the Missal, seeing it as contaminated by modernism as well and thus only celebrate Mass using the 1920 edition of the Missal. There is a dispute among sedevacantists on the acceptance of the 1955 rubrics of the Paschal Triduum introduced by Pius XII: some groups (such as the Society of Saint Pius V, the Roman Catholic Institute and the Istituto Mater Boni Consilii) reject them, believing them to be the first step towards the post-Conciliar liturgical renovations; others (such as the Congregation of Mary Immaculate Queen) accept them, seeing them as a liturgical change by a valid Pope and, thus, binding to all Catholics.

For information on the calendars included in pre-69/70 editions (a small part of the full Missal), see General Roman Calendar of 1960, General Roman Calendar of Pope Pius XII, General Roman Calendar of 1954, and Tridentine calendar.

== Official English translations ==
The International Commission on English in the Liturgy (ICEL) prepared an English translation of the 1970 Roman Missal, which was approved by the individual English-speaking episcopal conferences and, after being reviewed by the Holy See, was put into effect, beginning with the United States in 1973.

The authority for the episcopal conferences, with the consent of the Holy See, to decide on such translations was granted by the Second Vatican Council.

ICEL prepared a greatly altered English translation, and presented it for the consent of the Holy See in 1998. The Holy See withheld its consent and informed ICEL that the Latin text of the Missal, which must be the basis of translations into other languages, was being revised, making irrelevant a translation based on what would no longer be the official text of the Roman Missal.

On 28 March 2001, the Holy See issued the Instruction Liturgiam Authenticam, which included the requirement that in translations of the liturgical texts from the official Latin originals, "the original text, insofar as possible, must be translated integrally and in the most exact manner, without omissions or additions in terms of their content, and without paraphrases or glosses. Any adaptation to the characteristics or the nature of the various vernacular languages is to be sober and discreet." This was a departure from the principle of functional equivalence promoted in ICEL translations after the Second Vatican Council.

In the following year, the third typical edition of the revised Roman Missal in Latin, which had already been promulgated in 2000, was released. These two texts made clear the need for a new official English translation of the Roman Missal, particularly because the previous one was at some points an adaptation rather than strictly a translation. An example is the rendering of the response "Et cum spiritu tuo" (literally, "And with your spirit") as "And also with you." Accordingly, the International Commission on English in the Liturgy prepared, with some hesitancy on the part of the bishops, a new English translation of the Roman Missal, the completed form of which received the approval of the Holy See in April 2010.

On 19 July 2001, the Congregation for Divine Worship and the Discipline of the Sacraments established an international committee of English-speaking bishops, called the Vox Clara Committee, "to advise that Dicastery in its responsibilities related to the translation of liturgical texts in the English language and to strengthen effective cooperation with the Conferences of Bishops". On the occasion of the meeting of the committee in Rome in April 2002, Pope John Paul II sent them a message emphasizing that "fidelity to the rites and texts of the Liturgy is of paramount importance for the Church and Christian life" and charging the committee to ensure that "the texts of the Roman Rite are accurately translated in accordance with the norms of the Instruction Liturgiam authenticam". Liturgiam authenticam also took from the Bishops' conferences the power to make its own translations and instituted a papal commission, Vox Clara, to revise the Bishops' work. In 2008 it made an estimated 10,000 changes to the ICEL's proposed text. By 2017 Pope Francis had formed a commission to review and evaluate Liturgiam authenticam.

The work of making a new translation of the Roman Missal was completed in time to enable the national episcopal conference in most English-speaking countries to put it into use from the first Sunday of Advent (27 November) 2011.

As well as translating "Et cum spiritu tuo" as "And with your spirit", which some scholars suggest refers to the gift of the Holy Spirit the priest received at ordination, in the Niceno-Constantinopolitan Creed "consubstantial with the Father" was used as a translation of "consubstantialem Patri" (in Greek "ὁμοούσιον τῷ Πατρί"), instead of "of one Being with the Father" (or, in the United States only, "one in Being with the Father"), and the Latin phrase qui pro vobis et pro multis effundetur in remissionem peccatorum, formerly translated as "It will be shed for you and for all so that sins may be forgiven", was translated literally as "which will be poured out for you and for many for the forgiveness of sins" (see Pro multis).

This new official translation of the entire Order of Mass is available on the website of the United States Conference of Catholic Bishops, which also provides a comparison between the new text of the people's parts and that hitherto in use in the United States (where the version of the Nicene Creed was slightly different from that in other English-speaking countries).

Pope Benedict XVI remarked: "Many will find it hard to adjust to unfamiliar texts after nearly forty years of continuous use of the previous translation. The change will need to be introduced with due sensitivity, and the opportunity for catechesis that it presents will need to be firmly grasped. I pray that in this way any risk of confusion or bewilderment will be averted, and the change will serve instead as a springboard for a renewal and a deepening of Eucharistic devotion all over the English-speaking world."

The plan to introduce the new English translation of the missal was not without critics. Over 22,000 electronic signatures, some of them anonymous, were collected on a web petition to ask the Bishops, Cardinals and the Pope to reconsider the new translation. At the time there was open dissent from one parish in Seattle.

The Southern African Catholic Bishops' Conference (Botswana, South Africa, Swaziland) put into effect the changes in the people's parts of the revised English translation of the Order of Mass from 28 November 2008, when the Missal as a whole was not yet available. Protests were voiced on grounds of content and because it meant that Southern Africa was thus out of line with other English-speaking countries. One bishop claimed that the English-speaking conferences should have withstood the Holy See's insistence on a more literal translation. However, when in February 2009 the Holy See declared that the change should have awaited completion of work on the Missal, the bishops conference appealed, with the result that those parishes that had adopted the new translation were directed to continue using it, while those that had not were told to await further instructions before doing so. In view of the foreseen opposition to making changes, the various English-speaking episcopal conferences arranged catechesis on the Mass and the Missal, and made information available also on the Internet. Other initiatives included the Catholic News Agency publishing a series of ten articles on the revised translation.

In 2012, the Catholic Bishops Conference of the Philippines revised the 41-year-old liturgy with an English version of the Roman Missal, and later translated it in the vernacular to several native languages in the Philippines. For instance, in 2024, the Roman Catholic Diocese of Malolos uses the Tagalog language Roman Missal entitled "Ang Aklat ng Mabuting Balita."

== Pope Francis' approach ==
On 9 September 2017 Pope Francis issued the motu proprio Magnum Principium ("The Great Principle") which allowed local bishops' conferences more authority over translation of liturgical documents. The motu proprio "grants the episcopal conferences the faculty to judge the worth and coherence of one or another phrase in the translations from the original." The role of the Vatican is also modified in accord with the decree of Vatican II, to confirming texts already prepared by bishops' conferences, rather than "recognition" in the strict sense of Canon Law no. 838.

== See also ==
- Pontifical
- Missale Romanum Glagolitice
- Customary (liturgy)
