= Donald Sanborn =

American sedeprivationist bishop (born 1950)

Donald Sanborn ICR, TOSD
- Superior General of the Roman Catholic Institute
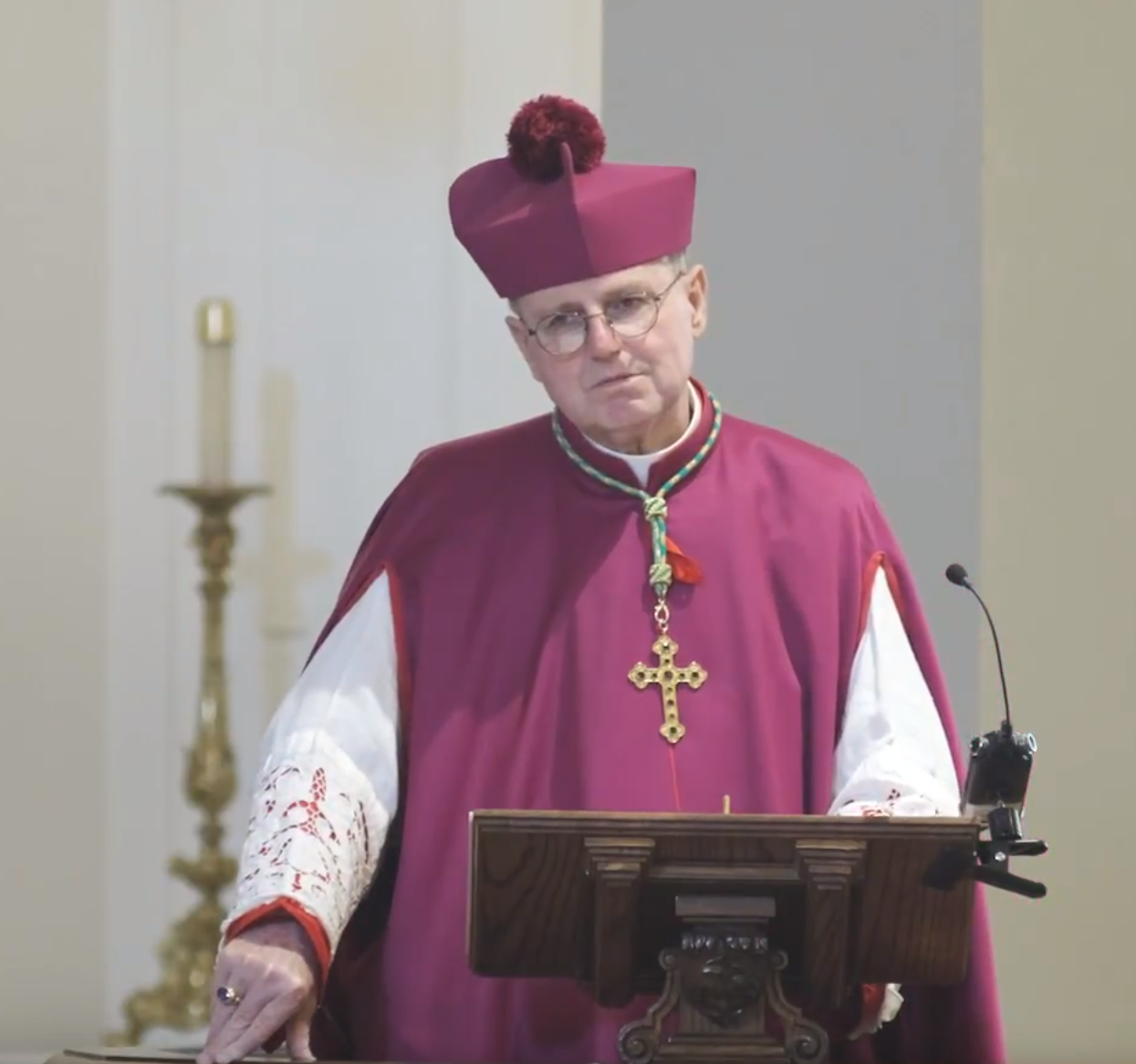
- Sanborn preaching at Most Holy Trinity Seminary, 2018

Orders
- Ordination: 29 June 1975 by Marcel Lefebvre
- Consecration: 19 June 2002 by Robert McKenna

Personal details
- Born: Donald Jerome Sanborn; February 19, 1950 (age 76) Flushing, Queens, New York, U.S.
- Denomination: Sedeprivationist Catholic
- Residence: Reading, Pennsylvania, U.S.
- Education: The International Seminary of Saint Pius X, Écône, Switzerland
- Motto: Sanctifica eos in veritate (Sanctify them in truth [Jn. 17:17])
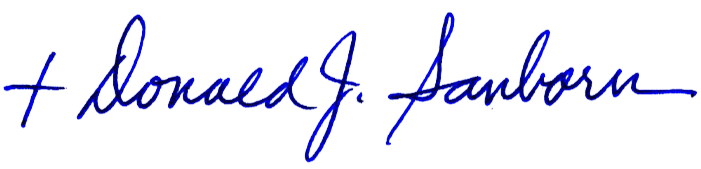
- Signature: Donald Sanborn's signature

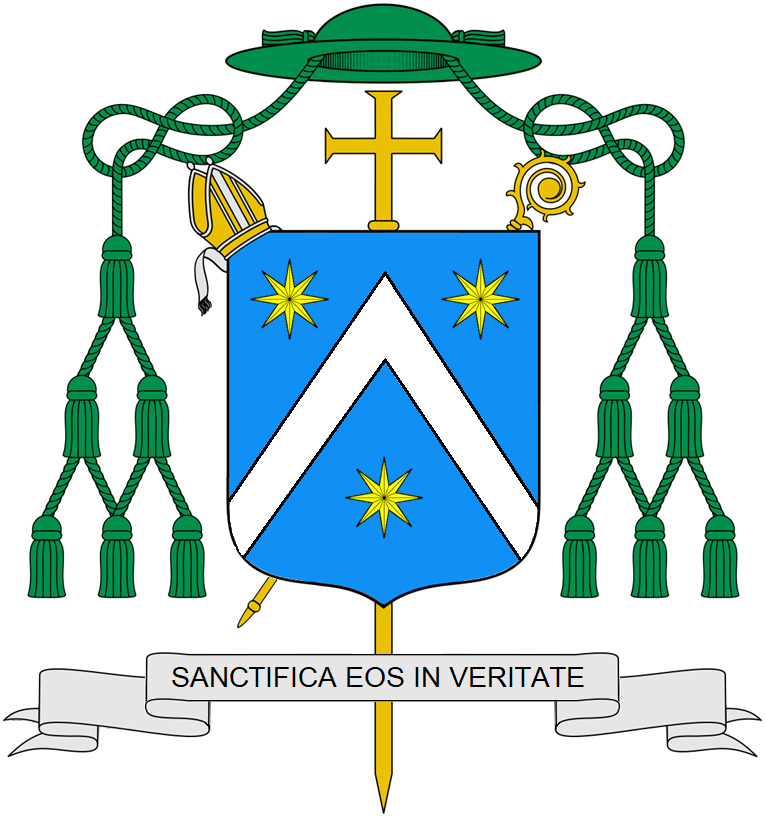
- Coat of arms: Donald Sanborn's coat of arms

Styles of Donald Sanborn
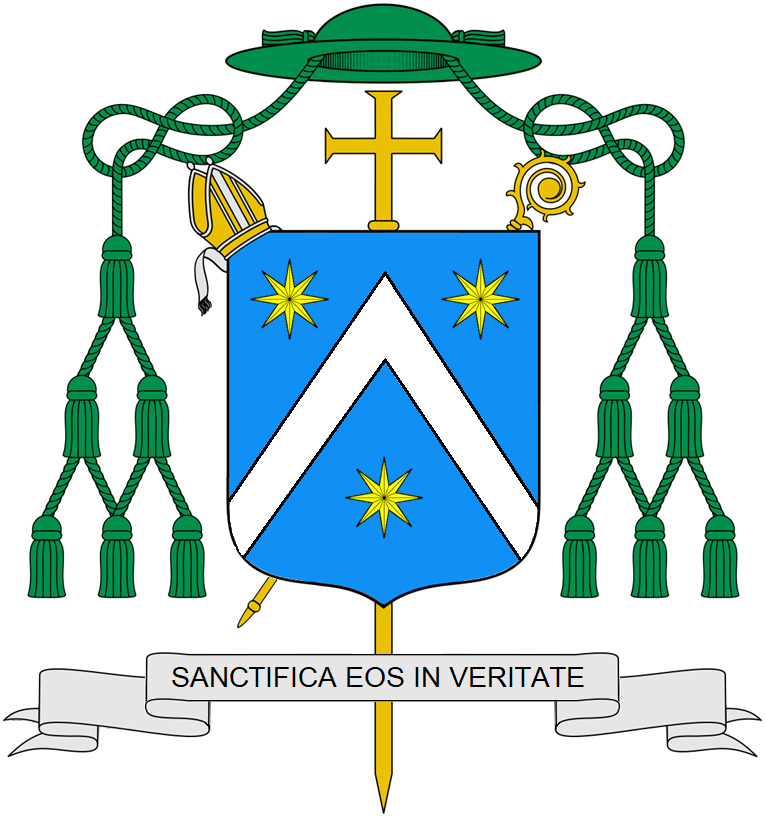

Ordination history of Donald Sanborn
History
Priestly ordination
- Ordained by: Marcel Lefebvre
Episcopal consecration
- Consecrated by: Robert McKenna
Episcopal succession
Bishops consecrated by Donald Sanborn as principal consecrator
- Joseph Selway: February 22, 2018
- Germán Fliess: November 30, 2022

Donald J. Sanborn (born February 19, 1950) is an American traditionalist Catholic bishop who is known for his advocacy of sedeprivationism. He currently serves as the superior general of the sedeprivationist Roman Catholic Institute (RCI) and rector of the sedevacantist Most Holy Trinity Seminary in Reading, Pennsylvania, United States.

== Biography ==
=== Early years ===
Donald Sanborn was born into a Catholic family in Flushing, Queens, New York, United States. There, he attended Catholic elementary and high schools. In 1967, he entered the seminary college for the Diocese of Brooklyn, where, in 1971, he graduated cum laude, having majored in classical languages.

=== Priesthood ===
==== Society of Saint Pius X ====
In 1971, Sanborn dropped out of the Seminary of the Immaculate Conception, whose training he considered modernist, and entered the International Seminary of Saint Pius X in Écône, Switzerland, of the traditionalist Society of Saint Pius X (SSPX), becoming one of the first seminarians of the newly founded society.

On 29 June 1975, in Écône, he was ordained a priest by Archbishop Marcel Lefebvre of the SSPX. Canonical recognition of the SSPX had been withdrawn by the local Roman Catholic bishop in May 1975, one month prior to his ordination, and this move was later upheld by the Holy See: the ordinations were therefore deemed to be valid but illicit by the Vatican and Sanborn and the other new priests were suspended a divinis.

By 1976, Sanborn was offering the traditional Latin Mass for Catholics on Long Island, New York, United States, together with Clarence Kelly.

==== Saint Thomas Aquinas Seminary ====
In 1977, Sanborn was teaching at a seminary of the SSPX which was then called Saint Joseph's House of Studies, in Armada, Michigan, United States. Later in the same year, he was appointed rector of the seminary.

==== Leaving the Society of Saint Pius X, co-founding the Society of Saint Pius V ====
Lefebvre directed the SSPX's American priests to follow the 1962 edition of the Roman Missal; Sanborn and eight other American priests refused to do this, preferring to use the 1920 edition. These nine priests accused Lefebvre of being insufficiently traditionalist. According to Sanborn, Lefebvre was imposing these liturgical and disciplinary changes in view of a reconciliation with the Vatican.

On April 27, 1983, these nine priests, along with some seminarians who were sympathetic to them, were promptly expelled from the SSPX by Lefebvre, for their refusal to use the 1962 Missal and for other reasons, such as their resistance to Lefebvre's order that priests of the SSPX must accept the decrees of nullity handed down by diocesan marriage tribunals, and their disapproval of the SSPX's policy of accepting into the society new members who had been ordained to the priesthood according to the revised sacramental rites of Paul VI. Almost immediately, these nine priests formed the Society of Saint Pius V (SSPV).

==== Most Holy Trinity Seminary ====
In 1995, Sanborn founded the sedevacantist Most Holy Trinity Seminary in Spring Lake, Florida, United States. Prior to his episcopal consecration later in 2002, the seminary's graduates were ordained by Daniel Dolan, who was consecrated a bishop in 1993. In 2005, the seminary was relocated to Brooksville, Florida.

=== Episcopacy ===
==== Episcopal consecration ====
On June 19, 2002, in Detroit, Michigan, Sanborn was consecrated a bishop by the American sedeprivationist bishop Robert McKenna of the Orthodox Roman Catholic Movement.

Sanborn served as pastor of the Queen of All Saints Chapel in Brooksville, Florida.

==== Episcopal consecration of Selway ====
On February 22, 2018, Sanborn consecrated his intended successor, Joseph Selway, as a bishop, with Bishop Geert Stuyver of the Istituto Mater Boni Consilii (Verrua Savoia, Turin, Italy) and Bishop Daniel Dolan (from West Chester, Ohio) assisting as co-consecrators.

==== Present day ====
Sanborn currently serves as the Superior General of the Roman Catholic Institute and as the rector of the Most Holy Trinity Seminary which was relocated from Brooksville, Florida to Reading, Pennsylvania in Fall 2022.

He frequently visits Mass centers in the United States and occasionally travels to Europe, meeting with sedevacantist and sedeprivationist clergy and laity.
