= Ottaviani Intervention =

1969 document

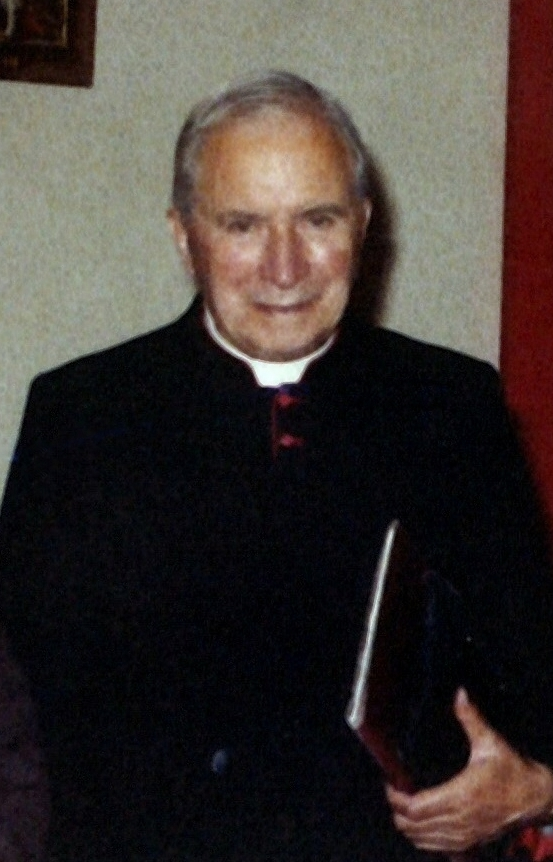
Marcel Lefebvre organized the study of the Novus Ordo Missae before forwarding it to Cardinal Ottaviani

Short Critical Study of the Novus Ordo Missae (Italian: Breve Esame Critico del Novus Ordo Missae), nicknamed the Ottaviani Intervention, is a 1969 document written by some Roman Catholic theologians led by Michel-Louis Guérard des Lauriers at the behest of archbishop Marcel Lefebvre to critique the orthodoxy of the draft text of the reformed Roman Liturgy. The study was given to Cardinal Ottaviani and later Cardinal Bacci, who sent it to Pope Paul VI. The study criticized what those theologians perceived as problems in the Institutio Generalis, the preparatory draft for what would eventually become the Mass of Paul VI —also called Novus Ordo Missae— and be promulgated in 1970.

== History ==
In the late 1960s, with the reform of the Mass underway as commanded by Sacrosanctum Concilium, archbishop Marcel Lefebvre organized a group of twelve theologians to summarize their objections to the Institutio Generalis, a preparatory working text in use before the final promulgation of the Mass of Paul VI in 1970. Michel-Louis Guérard des Lauriers, who later was excommunicated and became the intellectual progenitor of sedeprivationism, was the principal author of the study. Lefebvre then sent the study to Cardinal Alfredo Ottaviani, the former prefect of the Congregation for the Doctrine of the Faith.

Both Cardinal Ottaviani and Cardinal Antonio Bacci sent the Short Critical Study to Pope Paul VI with a cover letter signed by both men on 25 September 1969. The study cast doubt on the orthodoxy of the Mass of Paul VI, which had been promulgated by the apostolic constitution Missale Romanum of 3 April 1969, though the definitive text, which took account of some of the criticisms of the Short Critical Study, had not yet appeared, and the study itself was based on the Institutio Generalis.

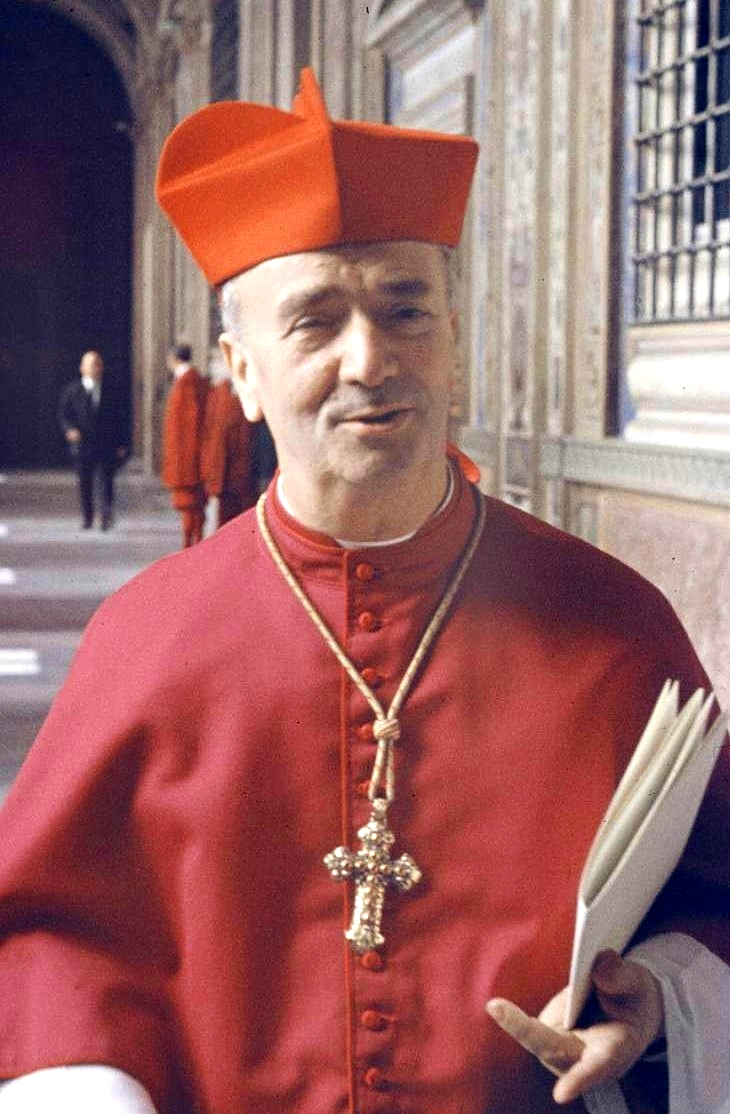
Cardinal Alfredo Ottaviani in 1958. Ottaviani, along with Cardinal Bacci, wrote a cover letter for the study, but did not write it themselves

Pope Paul VI asked the Congregation for the Doctrine of the Faith to examine the Short Critical Study. It responded on 12 November 1969 that the document contained many affirmations that were "superficial, exaggerated, inexact, emotional and false". Concurrently that November, in his weekly audiences, Paul VI unambiguously defended the orthodoxy of the reformed liturgy, explicitly affirming its sacrificial nature and that the reform had changed nothing substantially. Paul VI also noted that the full and complete Missal had not yet been finalized.

A letter of 17 February 1970 signed by Ottaviani and addressed to Gerard Lafond, was published by La Documentation catholique. It stated:

I have rejoiced profoundly to read the Discourse by the Holy Father on the question of the new Ordo Missae, and especially the doctrinal precisions contained in his discourses at the public Audiences of November 19 and 26 (Note: "PAOLO VI - UDIENZA GENERALE - Mercoledì, 19 novembre 1969". Holy See (in Italian). 19 November 1969.; "PAOLO VI - UDIENZA GENERALE - Mercoledì, 26 novembre 1969". Holy See (in Italian). 26 November 1969.; EWTN English translation) after which I believe, no one can any longer be genuinely scandalized. As for the rest, a prudent and intelligent catechesis must be undertaken to solve some legitimate perplexities which the text is capable of arousing. In this sense I wish your "Doctrinal Note" [on the Pauline Rite Mass] and the activity of the Militia Sanctae Mariae wide diffusion and success.

The letter also expressed regret on the part of the cardinal that his letter of 25 September 1969 had been published:

I regret only that my name has been misused in a way I did not wish, by publishing a letter that I wrote to the Holy Father without authorizing anyone to publish it.

Jean Madiran, a traditionalist Catholic who was the founder-director of the review Itinéraires, which was condemned by the French episcopate in 1966, made an unsubstantiated claim that Itinéraires had received the cardinal's authorization to publish his letter to the Pope and suggested that Ottaviani had signed the letter to Dom Gerard-Marie Lafond without knowing its contents, since Ottaviani was blind. This letter to Dom Lafond praised and approved a previous statement that Lafond published, Note Doctrinale sur le nouvel Ordo Missae, a Note which had claimed that the Cardinal Ottaviani himself had authored the parts of the new Missal which the Ottaviani Intervention criticized. Jean Madiran claimed that this letter was fraudulently presented to the elderly cardinal for his signature by Ottavinai's secretary, Monsignor (and future Cardinal) Gilberto Agustoni, and that Agustoni resigned shortly afterwards. This allegation remains unproven, and Madiran himself was not an eyewitness of the alleged deception.
