= Robert McKenna =

American sedeprivationist bishop (1927–2015)

Orders
- Ordination: 1958 by Amleto Giovanni Cicognani
- Consecration: 22 August 1986 by Michel-Louis Guérard des Lauriers

Personal details
- Born: 8 July 1927 Danville, Illinois, USA
- Died: 16 December 2015 (aged 88)
- Denomination: Traditionalist Catholic
- Profession: Bishop and exorcist

Robert Fidelis McKenna (8 July 1927 – 16 December 2015) was an American Catholic Traditionalist Catholic bishop and priest of the Dominican order. He was known for his traditionalist Catholic positions and was an advocate of sedeprivationism. McKenna was one of the leaders of the Orthodox Roman Catholic Movement (ORCM). He was also known from the Fox TV-movie The Haunted, which is about the Smurl haunting where McKenna conducted two exorcisms.

== Biography ==
McKenna was consecrated a bishop on 22 August 1986, in Raveau, France, by the French sedeprivationist Bishop Michel-Louis Guérard des Lauriers OP.

He died at the age of 88 on 16 December 2015. The sermon at his funeral was preached by Donald Sanborn.

== Exorcist ==
An exorcism he performed in 1985 in Warren, Massachusetts was featured in the Boston Herald and later recounted by the same reporters in the book Satan's Harvest. A spokesperson for the Archdiocese of Hartford, said that whatever ritual was performed on the boy was not sanctioned by the Roman Catholic Church and therefore could not be called an exorcism.

Furthermore, he believes that "the official establishment does not believe in the Devil ... but the Devil believes in them. They do not believe, and when they do, they don't want to get involved."

== Public stand ==
According to McKenna, the successors of Pope Pius XII have attempted to put the heresy of ecumenism in place of Catholicism by teaching that men have a natural right to worship as they see fit. Referring to this heresy as "a spiritual insanity", he wrote in an article "On Keeping Catholic":

Now while the Popes of Vatican II, including the present Benedict XVI, can function on the purely natural level in running the Church as an organization or legal corporation, they have on the supernatural level - in view of their spiritual madness - no divine authority to speak for the Church as the Mystical Body of Christ or to govern the faithful in His name; no power, that is to say, to function precisely as the Vicar of Christ for so long as this insanity continues. They and the bishops under them, blindly following them, are lacking the jurisdiction they would otherwise have under normal circumstances. We must simply ignore them and carry on as best as we can without them.

Concerning the bishops who are in union with Rome, he published a similar view in 1980:

Practically all bishops who are not definitely heretics are at least gravely suspect of heresy by reason of the sacrilegious outrages they have tolerated in their dioceses. As a consequence, they have either lost their jurisdiction or possess a very doubtful jurisdiction, and Canon Law itself expressly supplies priests jurisdiction in such cases.

== Audiovisual material ==
- 1999-2000 documentary on an exorcism performed by bishop McKenna O.P. on YouTube includes images from his chapel and nuns, while McKenna describes the exorcism.
- Tower of Trent Tribute at DailyCatholic.org
