= Istituto Mater Boni Consilii =

Catholic religious congregation

Institute of the Mother of Good Counsel
- Istituto Mater Boni Consilii
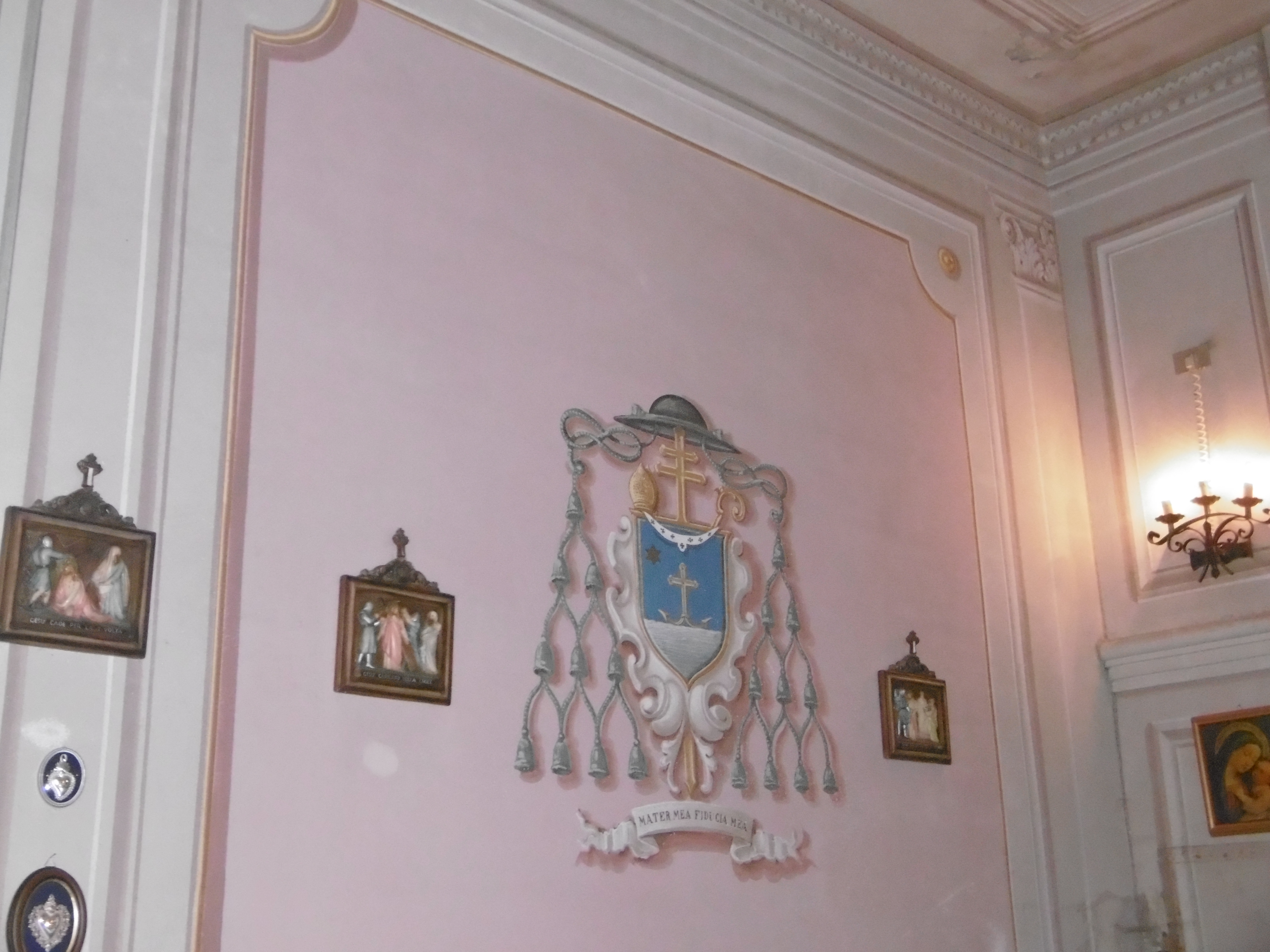
- Abbreviation: IMBC
- Formation: December 1985
- Type: Sedeprivationist Catholic religious congregation
- Headquarters: Verrua Savoia, Turin, Italy
- Superior General: Fr Francesco Ricossa
- Key people: Francesco Ricossa (co-founder); Giuseppe Murro (co-founder); Geert Stuyver (current bishop)
- Website: sodalitium.biz (Italian); sodalitiumpianum.com(English); sodalitium.eu (French); sodalitium.cloud (Dutch)

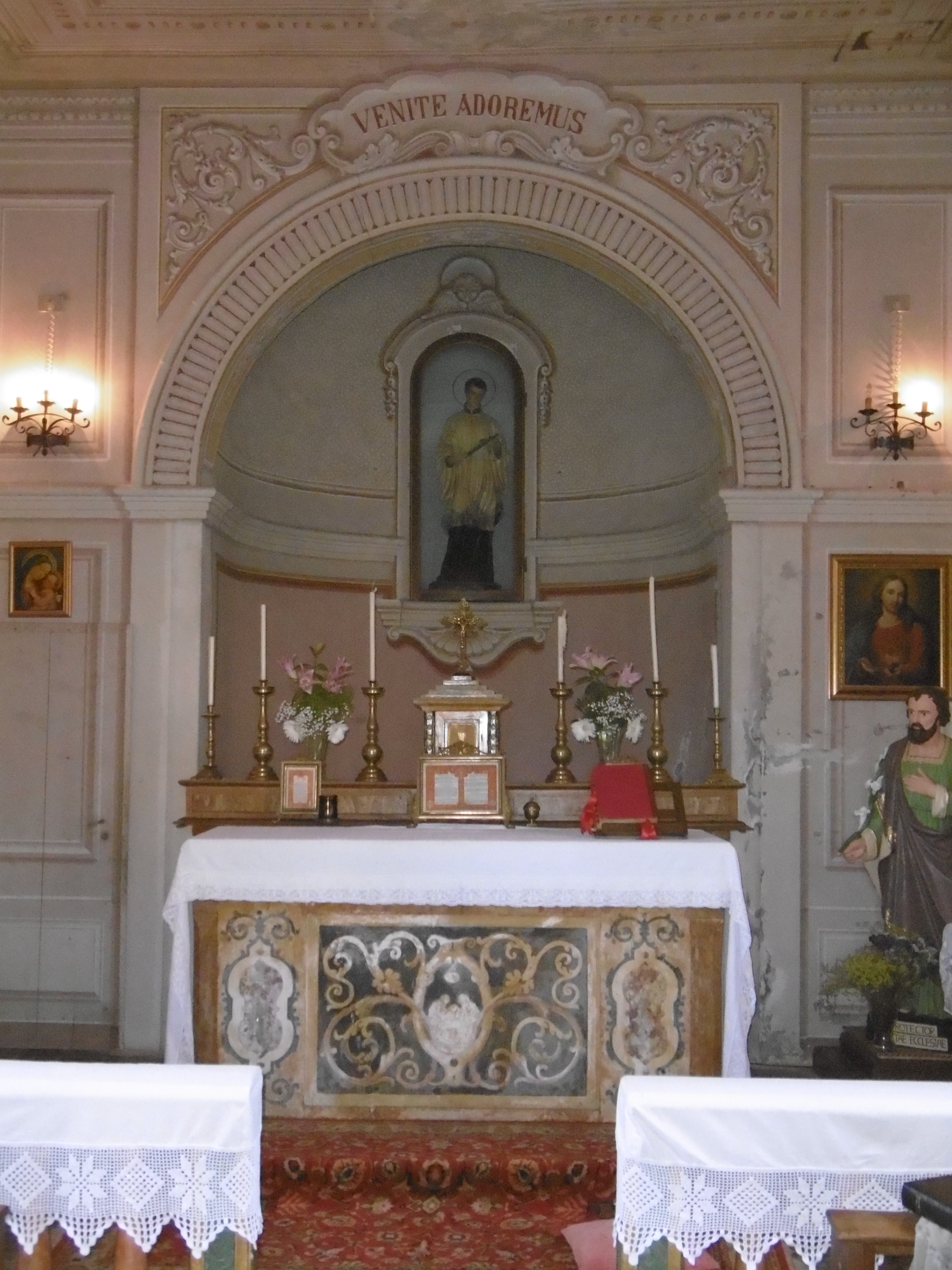
IMBC church in Ferrara, Emilia-Romagna, Italy

The Institute of the Mother of Good Counsel (Italian: Istituto Mater Boni Consilii; Latin: Institutum Mater Boni Consilii; IMBC) is a sedeprivationist traditionalist Catholic religious congregation based in Italy.

== History ==
The Institute was formed in December 1985, when four Italian priests left the Society of Saint Pius X (SSPX). These priests were Fr Francesco Ricossa, Fr Franco Munari, Fr Curzio Nitoglia, and Fr Giuseppe Murro. These priests were dissatisfied with the position of the SSPX, which acknowledged John Paul II as a true pope but disobeyed him.

The IMBC was first based in Nichelino, Province of Turin, Italy, then later in Verrua Savoia, Province of Turin (currently the Metropolitan City of Turin), Italy.

In September 1986, two priests of the Institute traveled to Raveau, France to meet Michel-Louis Guérard des Lauriers, whose sedeprivationist theory the Institute subsequently adopted.

In May 1987, the founders of the Institute wrote a retraction of doctrines they professed in the past when they still belonged to the SSPX.

== Bishops ==
In 1987, Des Lauriers consecrated to the episcopacy Father Franco Munari, an Italian priest and member of the IMBC. However, on 26 October 1990, Munari resigned from the episcopacy and priesthood.

From 1990 to 2002, the IMBC was assisted by Bishop Robert McKenna, an American sedeprivationist bishop, who had also been consecrated by Des Lauriers in 1987.

On 16 January 2002, McKenna consecrated to the episcopacy Father Geert Stuyver, a Belgian priest and member of the IMBC, who administers to the needs of the institute at present.

== Present day ==
The IMBC currently operates in Italy, France, Argentina, Switzerland, Hungary, the Netherlands and Belgium. It also irregularly celebrates Mass in Croatia, Romania, Finland, Sweden, and Bulgaria.

It celebrates the Tridentine Mass following the missal of Pope Pius V, as amended by Pope Pius X, rejecting the following amendments by Pope Pius XII and Pope John XXIII, but amended so as not to mention the Pope's name (non una cum). It owns a seminary, named Seminary of Saint Peter the Martyr, and published a magazine called Sodalitium.

The Institute is connected to three study centers (the Giuseppe Federici Study Center, the Paolo de Töth Study Center and the Davide Albertario Study Center), whose purpose is the study and defense of Catholic doctrine; to these is added the San Simonino Committee, which aims to restore the public cult of Simon of Trent, suppressed in 1965 by Archbishop Alessandro Maria Gottardi.

The IMBC also uses the name Sodalitium Pianum as an alternative name; this was the name of an unofficial group set up in the early twentieth century to report on those thought to be teaching Modernist doctrines.
