= Günther Storck =

Catholic Bishop from Germany

Orders
- Ordination: 21 September 1973 by Blasius Kurz
- Consecration: 30 April 1984 by Guerard des Lauriers

Personal details
- Born: 2 October 1938 Borken, North Rhine-Westphalia
- Died: 23 April 1993 (aged 54) Munich, Bavaria
- Buried: 3 May 1993 Munich West Cemetery
- Denomination: Sedevacantist Roman Catholic (1976–1979: SSPX)
- Residence: Munich
- Education: LMU Munich
- Motto: In verbo tuo

Günther Storck (2 October 1938 – 23 April 1993) was a Catholic priest from Germany who was excommunicated from the Catholic Church. He was consecrated – without permission of Pope John Paul II – a bishop on 30 April 1984, in Etiolles, France, by excommunicated bishop Guerard des Lauriers.

== Biography ==
=== Early life ===
Storck was born on 2 October 1938 in Borken, North Rhine-Westphalia, as the youngest child of the Storck family, who ran a craft business. The father died early, so that the mother not only had to take charge of the family, but also had to run the business.

=== Academic career ===
He studied classical philology and German studies at the University of Münster, the Humboldt University of Berlin, and LMU Munich. For his vocation to the priesthood, he returned to Münster, where he started a degree in theology at the seminary Collegium Borromaeum (1962). In the meanwhile he passed his state examination in philology, philosophy and theology. He then moved from Münster to Munich (1967), where he continued his studies at the theological and philosophical faculties of LMU Munich. A few years later, he became Research Associate of Leo Scheffczyk. He then moved to Egg in Switzerland for ordination (21 September 1973). The day after he celebrated his First Mass in Damenstiftskirche St. Anna. He did his doctorate in theology with a tripartite graduate thesis on Johann Gottlieb Fichte's Wissenschaftslehre of 1794/95 (first part) and on his Wissenschaftslehre of 1804 (second part); its concluding third part concerns the doctrine of the Trinity.

=== Death and legacy ===
Storck died of ill health on 23 April 1993 in Munich. On Friday, 30 April 1993, the solemn requiem was held for the deceased in St. Mary's Church, Munich – exactly nine years after his consecration as bishop. On the following Monday, 3 May 1993, the funeral took place at the Munich West Cemetery.

The first review of Storck's thesis appeared 20 years after its publication (see § Secondary literature). Seven additional years later, his teacher in philosophy resumed Storck's application of transcendental philosophy to the Trinity Doctrine, claiming that "the absolute difference between the Godmanhood of Jesus and the pure essence of God should have been worked out": "Godmanhood is not simply the same as the Godhead." Which eventually is confirmed by a revisionist reading of the Islamic view in Quran 5:116–117: "One notices the reference to Matthew 24:36: »Yet no one knows the day or hour when this will be, not the angels in heaven, nor the Son. Only the Father knows.«"

== Bibliography ==
=== Primary literature ===
- Die Gottesidee in der Wissenschaftslehre J.G. Fichtes. Darstellung des Absoluten und Entfaltung der Relevanz der Wissenschaftslehre in der Erörterung theologischer Grundfragen [The Idea of God in the Science of Knowledge J.G. Fichtes. Presentation of the Absolute and development of the relevance of the Science of Knowledge in the discussion of basic theological questions] (doctoral thesis; adviser: Leo Scheffczyk, second adviser: Reinhard Lauth) (in German). München. 1976.
- Rissling, Eugen (ed.). "Katechesen und Predigten von S.E. Dr. Bischof Storck" [Catechesis and Sermons by H.Em. Dr. Bishop Storck] (in German). Ulm: Arbeitskreis katholischer Glaube. Archived from the original on 2018-03-09.

=== Secondary literature ===
- Heller, Eberhard (July 1993). "Zum Tode von S.E. Bischof Dr. Günther Storck" [On the death of H.Em. Bishop Dr. Günther Storck]. Einsicht (Zeitschrift) (biography) (in German). Vol. 23, no. 2. Eurasburg: Freundeskreis der Una Voce e.V. pp. 37–41. Archived from the original on 2018-09-24.
- Jerrentrup, Christian (December 1996). "Günther Storck: 'Die Gottesidee der Wissenschaftslehre J.G. Fichtes'" [Günther Storck: 'The idea of God of the Wissenschaftslehre of J.G. Fichte']. Einsicht (review) (in German). Vol. 26, no. 5. Eurasburg: Freundeskreis der Una Voce e.V. pp. 92–93. Archived from the original on 2018-09-23.
- Eric W. Steinhauer [in German] (2001). "Storck, Günther". In Bautz, Traugott (ed.). Biographisch-Bibliographisches Kirchenlexikon (BBKL) (in German). Vol. 19. Nordhausen: Bautz. ISBN 3-88309-089-1.
- Rissling, Eugen (2003). "Zum 10. Jahrestag des Heimgangs von Bischof Günther Storck" [On the 10th anniversary of the death of Bishop Günther Storck] (biography) (in German). Ulm: Arbeitskreis katholischer Glaube. Archived from the original on 2017-09-03.
