= Sontheim =

Sontheim refers to the following municipalities in Germany:

- Sontheim an der Brenz
- Sontheim, Bavaria
