= Gommar DePauw =

American Roman Catholic priest

- Born: 11 October 1918
- Died: 6 May 2005 (aged 86)
- Education: Catholic University of Leuven

Gommar A. DePauw (11 October 1918 – 6 May 2005) was a Belgian-American traditionalist Catholic priest and founder of an organization that he called the Catholic Traditionalist Movement.

Sociologist and anthropologist of religion Michael W. Cuneo called dePauw, "the first Catholic traditionalist/separatist of any prominence in the United States", because of his early opposition to post-Vatican II changes in Catholic liturgy and practice.

== Education and career ==
From 1952 to 1963 DePauw taught canon law at Mount Saint Mary's Seminary in Emmitsburg, Maryland. In 1955 he requested and was granted excardination from the Diocese of Ghent to the Archdiocese of Baltimore and was named academic dean of the seminary.

On 23 June 1968 DePauw established the Ave Maria Chapel in Westbury, Long Island.

Fr. DePauw never broke communion with the visible Catholic Church, retaining incardination until his death in the suburbicarian diocese of Tivoli.

== Bibliography ==
- Conciliar or Catholic, 1967 lecture by DePauw
- The Educational Rights of the Church and Elementary Schools in Belgium, DePauw's book from Catholic University of America Press
