= Höchstetten =

There are several municipalities and communities that have the name Höchstetten:

- Höchstetten, Germany, in the municipality of Ansbach, Bavaria
- Höchstetten, Switzerland, in the Canton of Bern
