= Traditionalist Catholicism =

Catholic religious movement

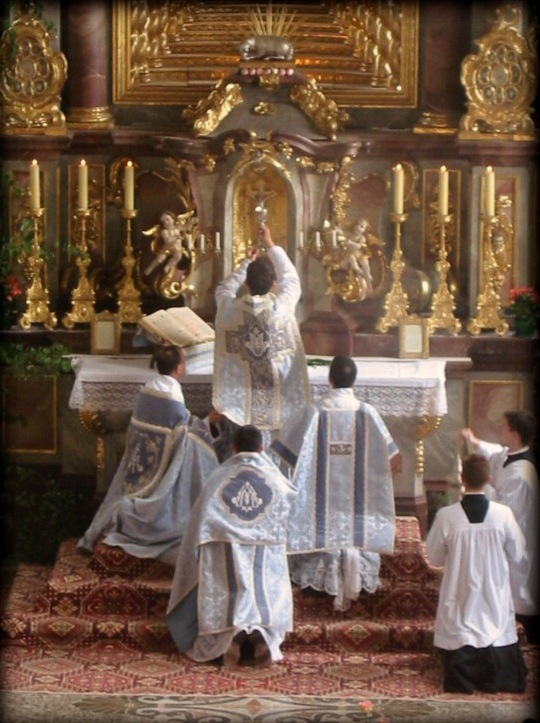
Mass celebrated ad orientem according to the Tridentine form of the Roman Rite. The ornate altar and priests' vestments are characteristic of Traditionalist Catholic practice.

Traditionalist Catholicism is a movement that emphasizes beliefs, practices, customs, traditions, liturgical forms, devotions and presentations of teaching associated with the Catholic Church before the Second Vatican Council (1962–1965). Traditionalist Catholics particularly emphasize the Tridentine Mass, the Roman Rite liturgy largely replaced in general use by the post–Second Vatican Council Mass of Paul VI.

Many traditionalist Catholics disliked the liturgical changes that followed the Second Vatican Council, and prefer to continue to practice pre-Second Vatican Council traditions and forms. Some also see present teachings on ecumenism as blurring the distinction between Catholics and other Christians. Traditional Catholicism is often more conservative in its philosophy and worldview, promoting a modest style of dressing and teaching a complementarian view of gender roles.

Some traditionalist Catholics reject the current papacy of the Catholic Church and follow positions of sedevacantism, sedeprivationism, or conclavism. As these groups are no longer in communion with the pope and the Holy See, they are not regarded by the Holy See to be members of the Catholic Church. A distinction is often made between these groups (sometimes called radical traditionalists) and those who adhere to current papal authority but prefer traditional practices.

== History ==
Toward the end of the Second Vatican Council, Father Gommar DePauw came into conflict with Cardinal Lawrence Shehan, Archbishop of Baltimore, over the interpretation of the council's teachings, particularly on liturgical matters. In January 1965, DePauw incorporated an organization called the Catholic Traditionalist Movement in New York State, purportedly with the support of Cardinal Francis Spellman, Archbishop of New York.

By the late 1960s and early 1970s, conservative Catholics opposed to or uncomfortable with the theological, social and liturgical developments brought about by the Second Vatican Council began to coalesce. In 1973, the Orthodox Roman Catholic Movement (ORCM) was founded by two priests, Francis E. Fenton and Robert McKenna, and set up chapels in many parts of North America to preserve the Tridentine Mass. Priests who participated in this were listed as being on a leave of absence by their bishops, who disapproved of their actions.

In 1970, French Archbishop Marcel Lefebvre founded the Society of Saint Pius X (SSPX), made up of priests who would say only the Traditional Latin Mass and who opposed what he saw as excessive liberal influences in the Church after Vatican II. In 1988, Lefebvre and another bishop consecrated four men as bishops without papal permission, resulting in excommunication latae sententiae for all six men directly involved. Some members of the SSPX, unwilling to participate in what they considered schism, left and founded the Priestly Fraternity of Saint Peter (FSSP), which celebrates the Tridentine Mass and is in full communion with the Holy See. In 2009, Pope Benedict XVI lifted the excommunications of the four surviving bishops, but clarified that the society had "no canonical status within the Catholic Church."

The Istituto Mater Boni Consilii (IMBC) was founded in 1985. It is a sedeprivationist religious congregation of clergy who were dissatisfied with the SSPX's position on the Pope, i.e., acknowledging John Paul II as pope but disobeying him. Sedeprivationists hold that the current occupant of the papal office is a duly elected pope but lacks the authority and ability to teach or govern unless he recants the changes brought by the Second Vatican Council.

Some Catholics took the position of sedevacantism, which teaches Pope John XXIII and his successors are heretics and therefore cannot be considered popes, and that the Catholic Church's sacraments are not valid. One sedevacantist group, the Society of Saint Pius V (SSPV), broke off from the SSPX in 1983, due to liturgical disputes. Another sedevacantist group, the Congregation of Mary Immaculate Queen (CMRI), formed spontaneously among the followers of Francis Schuckardt, but he was later expelled due to scandals and CMRI is now more aligned with other sedevacantist groups.

Other groups known as Conclavists have elected their own popes in opposition to the post–Vatican II pontiffs. They are not considered serious claimants except by their very few followers. In the late 1980s, David Bawden promoted the idea of a new conclave, and sent out over 200 copies of a book of his to the editors of all the sedevacantist publications he could find, and to all the priests listed in a directory of traditionalists as being sedevacantist. He was then elected in 1990 by a group of six people who included himself and his parents, taking the name Pope Michael.

== Different types ==
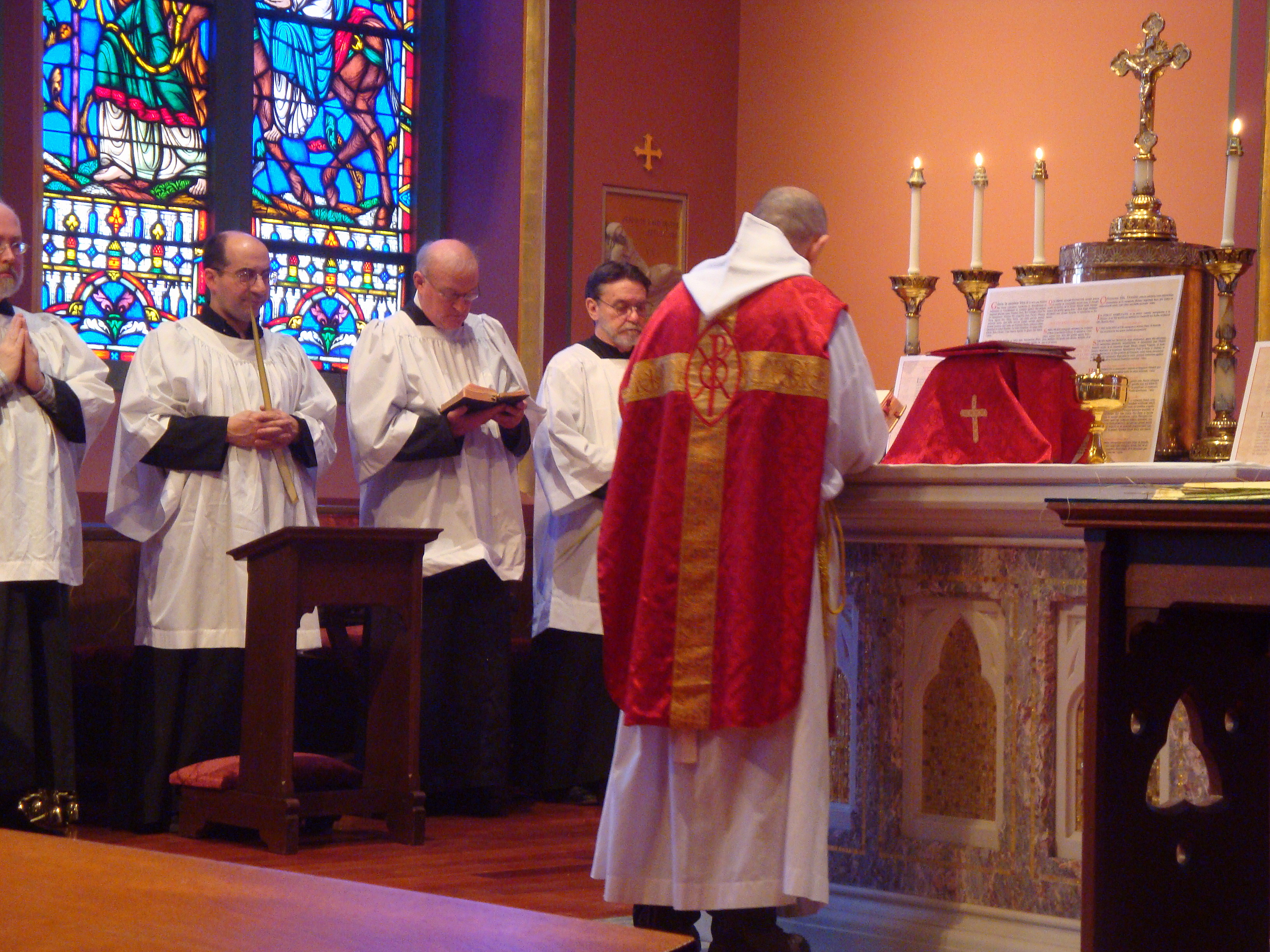
Tridentine Mass in a chapel of the Cathedral of the Holy Cross, Boston, Palm Sunday 2009

=== Canonically regular with the Holy See ===
Since the Second Vatican Council, several traditionalist organizations have been started with or have subsequently obtained approval from the Catholic Church. These organizations officially accept the documents of the Second Vatican Council and regard the changes associated with the Council (such as the revision of the Mass) as legitimate, but celebrate the older forms with the approval of the Holy See.

- Priestly Fraternity of St Peter (FSSP)
- Institute of Christ the King Sovereign Priest (ICKSP, ICRSS)
- Institute of the Good Shepherd (IBP)
- Servants of Jesus and Mary (SJM)
- Canons Regular of the New Jerusalem (CRNJ)
- Canons Regular of Saint John Cantius (SJC)
- Canons Regular of the Holy Cross
- Fraternity of Saint Vincent Ferrer
- Personal Apostolic Administration of Saint John Mary Vianney (PAASJV)

There are also multiple monastic communities, including

- Monastery of Our Lady of the Annunciation of Clear Creek
- Monastery of St. Benedict in Norcia
- Monks of the Most Blessed Virgin Mary of Mount Carmel
- Monastery of Our Lady of the Cenacle
- Le Barroux Abbey

See Communities using the Tridentine Mass for a more detailed list.

=== Society of Saint Pius X ===
The Society of Saint Pius X (SSPX) was founded in 1970, with the authorization of the bishop of Lausanne, Geneva and Fribourg, by Archbishop Marcel Lefebvre. Lefebvre was declared to have incurred automatic excommunication in 1988, after illicit consecrations. In January 2009 the Prefect of the Congregation for Bishops remitted the excommunications the Congregation had declared to have been incurred by the Society's bishops in 1988.

More recently, the Vatican has granted SSPX priests the authority to hear confessions and has authorized local ordinaries, in certain circumstances, to grant delegation to SSPX priests to act as the qualified witness required for valid celebration of marriage. The Our Lady of Guadalupe Monastery in Silver City, New Mexico, which is affiliated with the SSPX, is seeking Vatican approval through the society.

In 2017, a statement from the Holy See said the SSPX had an irregular canonical status "for the time being".

In July 2026, a Vatican decree was issued stating that Ministers of SSPX were excommunicated from the Catholic Church as a consequence of the consecration of four bishops on July 1, 2026. The consecrating bishops, as well as the newly consecrated bishops, were specifically named in the decree. The decree states that those who formally adhere to the SSPX Fraternity also are to be considered excommunicated, and any sacraments offered by such priests are illicit, and that sacraments of penance and marriage conducted by them are not valid.

=== Sedeprivationists ===
Sedeprivationists hold the view that the current occupant of the papal office is a duly elected pope but lacks the authority and ability to teach or govern unless he recants the changes brought by the Second Vatican Council. Sedeprivationists teach that the popes from Pope John XXIII onward fall into this category. Sedeprivationism is currently endorsed by two groups:

- Istituto Mater Boni Consilii (IMBC), led by Superior General Fr. Francesco Ricossa;
- Roman Catholic Institute (RCI), led by Bishop Donald Sanborn.

=== Sedevacantists ===
Sedevacantists hold the view that the Vatican II popes have forfeited their position through their acceptance of heretical teachings connected with the Second Vatican Council and consequently there is at present no true pope. This constitutes an act of schism and is an offense which can result in excommunication. They conclude, on the basis of their rejection of the revised rite of Mass and of certain aspects of postconciliar Church teaching as false, that the popes involved are also false. This is a minority position among traditionalist Catholics and a highly divisive one, so that many who hold it prefer to say nothing of their view, while other sedevacantists have accepted episcopal ordination from sources such as Archbishop Pierre Martin Ngô Đình Thục.

The terms sedevacantist and sedevacantism derive from the Latin phrase sede vacante ("while the chair/see [of Saint Peter] is vacant"). Sedevacantist groups include:

- Congregation of Mary Immaculate Queen (CMRI), formed in 1967. It operates in North America, South America, Europe, and Asia; is based in Omaha, Nebraska, United States; and is headed by Bishop Mark Pivarunas.
- Society of Saint Pius V (SSPV), formed in 1983 when nine American priests of the Society of Saint Pius X split from the organization over a number of issues including using the liturgical reforms implemented under Pope John XXIII. It operates in North America, is based in Norwood, Ohio, United States, and was headed by Bishop Clarence Kelly until his death in December 2023.
- Sociedad Sacerdotal Trento (Priestly Society of Trent; SST), formed in 1993 by the priests of the deceased Bishop Moisés Carmona. Its bishop is Bishop Martín Dávila Gandara.
- Sons of the Most Holy Redeemer (FSSR) (since May 2026)

=== Conclavists ===
Conclavism is the belief and practice of some who, claiming that all recent occupants of the papal see are not true popes, elect someone else and propose him as the true pope to whom the allegiance of Catholics is due.

== Positions ==
Pope Benedict XVI contrasted the "hermeneutic of discontinuity and rupture" that some apply to the Council (an interpretation adopted both by certain traditionalists and by certain "progressives") with the "hermeneutic of reform, as it was presented first by Pope John XXIII in his Speech inaugurating the Council on 11 October 1962 and later by Pope Paul VI in his Discourse for the Council's conclusion on 7 December 1965." He made a similar point in a speech to the bishops of Chile in 1988, when he was still Cardinal Joseph Ratzinger:

Archbishop Lefebvre declared that he has finally understood that the agreement he signed aimed only at integrating his foundation into the "Conciliar Church". The Catholic Church in union with the Pope is, according to him, the 'Conciliar Church' which has broken with its own past. It seems indeed that he is no longer able to see that we are dealing with the Catholic Church in the totality of its Tradition, and that Vatican II belongs to that.

Responding to a comment that some consider tradition in a rigid way, Pope Francis remarked in 2016, "there's a traditionalism that is a rigid fundamentalism; this is not good. Fidelity on the other hand implies growth. In transmitting the deposit of faith from one epoch to another, tradition grows and consolidates itself with the passing of time, as St Vincent of Lérins said [...] 'The dogma of the Christian religion too must follow these laws. It progresses, consolidates itself with the years, developing itself with time, deepening itself with age'."

=== Radical Traditionalists' assessment of Vatican II ===
Radical Traditionalists' claims that substantive changes have taken place in Catholic teaching and practice since the Council often crystallize around the following specific alleged examples:

- Sedevacantist Donald J. Sanborn rejects an ecclesiology that he claims fails to recognize the Catholic Church as the one true church established by Jesus Christ, and instead holds that the Roman Catholic Church is some subset of the church Christ founded. He sees some of the confusion as stemming from an unclear understanding of the phrase "subsists in" which appears in the Vatican II document Lumen gentium, and which the Church has declared applies uniquely to the Catholic Church and means the "perduring, historical continuity and permanence of all the elements instituted by Christ in the Catholic Church, in which the Church of Christ is concretely found on this earth". He claims that this "new ecclesiology" contradicts Pope Pius XII's Mystici corporis Christi and other papal documents.
- The SSPX denounces a teaching on collegiality that attributes to the bishops of the world a share, with the Pope, of responsibility for the Church's governance in a way that it claims is destructive of papal authority and encourages a "national" church mentality that undermines the primacy of the Holy See. It also claims that national bishops' conferences, whose influence greatly increased following the Council, "diminish the personal responsibility of bishop[s]" within their dioceses.

=== Criticism of the Radical Traditionalists' positions ===
Those who, in response to these criticisms by certain traditionalists, defend the decisions of the Second Vatican Council and the subsequent changes made by the Holy See make the following counterclaims:

- The criticisms are false, exaggerated, or lacking appreciation of the organic character of Tradition, traditionalist criticisms that Dignitatis humanae contradicts the Church's earlier teaching on religious liberty are an example.
- Traditionalists who claim that there has been a break from and discontinuity with the Church's traditional teaching are displaying a Protestant attitude of "private judgment" on matters of doctrine instead of accepting the guidance of the Magisterium of the Church.
- Traditionalists fail to distinguish properly between changeable pastoral practices (such as the liturgy of the Mass) and the unchangeable principles of the Catholic faith (such as the dogmas surrounding the Mass).
- Traditionalists of this kind treat papal authority in much the same way as the dissident, liberal Catholics. While liberals believe that, on sexual matters, "the Pope can teach whatever he wants... but whether or not he should be listened to is very much an open question", the stance of certain traditionalists on the reform of the Mass liturgy and contemporary teachings on ecumenism and religious liberty amounts to the view that, on these issues, "faithful Catholics are always free to resist [the Pope's] folly. [...] As theories of religious dissent go, Catholic liberals couldn't ask for anything more."
- Traditionalists claim that the Second Vatican Council was pastoral (and not infallible), but Paul VI subsequently emphasized the authoritative nature of the Council's teachings.

=== Reception ===
Integrism is traditionalist Catholicism that integrates social and political contexts. Kay Chadwick described Catholic integrism as a holding "anti-Masonic, anti-liberal and anti-Communist" political objectives. She also noted its alignment with the right-wing press and an annual Parisian Joan of Arc procession with participation by both integrists and National Front supporters. A Tridentine Mass was celebrated before the annual National Front party meeting. Lefebvre was fined in France for "racial defamation" and "incitement to racial hatred" for proposing the removal of immigrants—particularly Muslims—from Europe. Lefebvre also supported Latin American dictatorships, Charles Maurras, Philippe Pétain, and the continued occupation of French Algeria.

The Southern Poverty Law Center (SPLC) used the term radical traditionalist Catholics to refer to those who "may make up the largest single group of serious anti-Semites in America, subscribe to an ideology that is rejected by the Vatican and some 70 million mainstream American Catholics. Many of their leaders have been condemned and even excommunicated by the official church." The SPLC claims that adherents of radical traditional Catholicism "routinely pillory Jews as 'the perpetual enemy of Christ'", reject the ecumenical efforts of the Vatican, and sometimes assert that all recent Popes are illegitimate. The SPLC says that adherents are "incensed by the liberalizing reforms" of the Second Vatican Council (1962–1965) which condemned hatred for Jewish people and "rejected the accusation that Jews are collectively responsible for deicide in the form of the crucifixion of Christ" and that "Radical traditional Catholics" also embrace "extremely conservative social ideals with respect to women."

In January 2023, the FBI's Richmond Field Office produced an internal memorandum identifying "radical-traditionalist Catholics" as potential domestic violent extremists, proposing surveillance of parishes and development of sources among clergy. The memo relied on the Southern Poverty Law Center's designation of nine "radical traditionalist Catholic hate groups" as a key source. The document was withdrawn after it was leaked in February 2023, drawing bipartisan condemnation from Attorney General Merrick Garland, who called it "appalling", and FBI Director Christopher Wray, who said he was "aghast".

== Practices ==
Traditionalist Catholicism has been described as "a self-conscious revival of the liturgies, practices, and trappings of an earlier time in the Catholic Church", and this manifests in a number of ways.

=== Rite of Mass ===
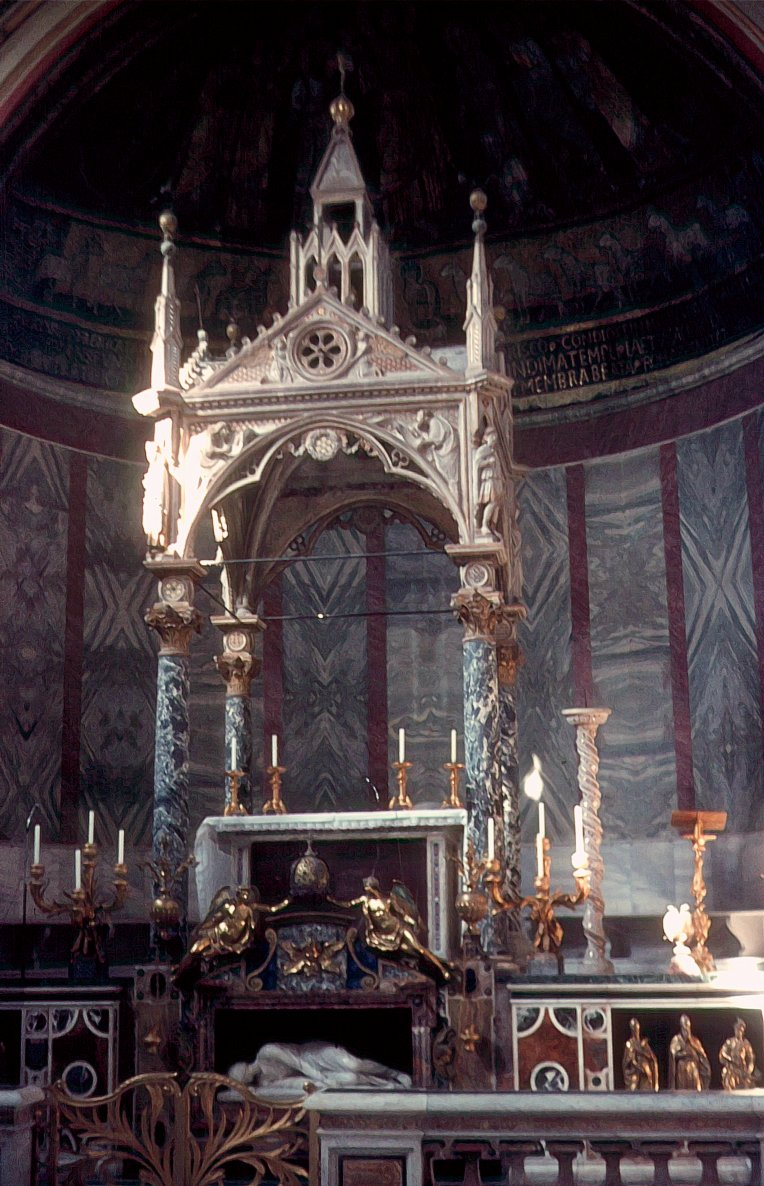
Altar of Santa Cecilia in Trastevere, erected in 1700 and still used today. It faces both east and versus populum (towards the people).

The best-known and most visible sign of Catholic traditionalism is an attachment to the form that the Roman Rite liturgy of the Mass had before the liturgical reform of 1969–1970, in the various editions of the Roman Missal published between 1570 and 1962. This form is generally known as the Tridentine Mass, though traditionalists usually prefer to call it the Traditional Mass. Many refer to it as the Latin Mass, though Latin is the language also of the official text of the post–Vatican II Mass, to which vernacular translations are obliged to conform, and canon law states that "the eucharistic celebration is to be carried out in the Latin language or in another language provided that the liturgical texts have been legitimately approved." In his 2007 motu proprio Summorum Pontificum Pope Benedict XVI relaxed the regulations on use of the 1962 Missel, designating it "an" extraordinary form of the Roman Rite, as opposed to "the" ordinary or normal form, as revised successively by Pope Paul VI and Pope John Paul II.

The Pope ruled that priests of the Latin Church can freely choose between the 1962 Roman Missal and the later edition "in Masses celebrated without the people". Such celebrations may be attended by those who spontaneously ask to be allowed. Priests in charge of churches can permit stable groups of laypeople attached to the earlier form to have Mass celebrated for them in that form, provided that the celebrating priest is "qualified to [celebrate] and not juridically impeded". The Society of Saint Pius X welcomed the document, but referred to "difficulties that still remain", including "disputed doctrinal issues" and the notice of excommunication that still affected its bishops.

In 2021, Pope Francis promulgated Traditionis custodes, amending and abrogating parts of Summorum Pontificum.

=== Individual and private devotions ===
Some traditionalist Catholics stress following customs prevailing immediately before the Second Vatican Council, such as the following:

- Fasting from Midnight until the reception of Holy Communion. The traditional Catholic rule of fasting from midnight until the reception of Holy Communion (this Eucharistic Fast is from both food and liquids), which is required by the 1917 Code of Canon Law, was shortened in 1953 by Pope Pius XII to a 3-hour fast. In 1966, Pope Paul VI reduced the fast further to one hour, a rule included in the 1983 Code of Canon Law. Some traditional Catholic groups require fasting from midnight until they receive Holy Communion at Mass, while others will keep a Eucharistic fast for at least three hours.
- Kneeling to receive Communion directly upon the tongue, under the Host species alone, and from the hand of a cleric rather than a layperson. The SSPX regards the practice of receiving communion in the hand (though ancient and authorised by the Holy See) as an abuse.
- Women wearing a headcovering when praying at home and when worshipping inside a church which is discussed in 1 Corinthians 11 and required by the 1917 Code of Canon Law. Many Traditionalist Catholic women wear a veil, a hat, or a headscarf when praying at home and when worshipping inside a church.

=== Clothing and lifestyle ===
Traditional Catholics, with respect to male and female gender roles, often adhere to the doctrine of complementarianism.

The standards of clothing among Traditional Catholics, based on instructions given by Pope Pius XI and consequently promoted by the Purity Crusade of Mary Immaculate, is referred to as "Mary-like Modesty", which includes for women, wearing sleeves "extending at least to the elbows" and "skirts reaching below the knees", as well as having a neckline no more than two inches with the rest of the bodice fully covered.

It is commonplace for women who identify as traditionalist Catholics to wear a head covering (veil) while praying at home and attending celebrations of the Mass.

== In the Ukrainian Greek Catholic Church ==
Since the Second Vatican Council, various Eastern Catholic Churches have removed some practices and emphases that were derived from those of the Latin Church. Opposition to this has been given relatively high publicity with regard to the Ukrainian Greek Catholic Church (UGCC).

=== Background ===
Even before the Second Vatican Council, the Holy See declared it important to guard and preserve whole and entire forever the customs and distinct forms for administering the sacraments in use in the Eastern Catholic Churches (Pope Leo XIII, encyclical Orientalium Dignitas). Leo's successor Pope Pius X said that the priests of the newly created Russian Catholic Church should offer the Divine Liturgy Nec Plus, Nec Minus, Nec Aliter ("No more, No Less, No Different") than priests of the Russian Orthodox Church and the Old Believers.

In the Ukrainian Greek Catholic Church, liturgical de-latinization began with the 1930s corrections of the liturgical books by Metropolitan Andrey Sheptytsky. According to his biographer Cyril Korolevsky, Metropolitan Andrey opposed the use of coercion against those who remained attached to Latin liturgical practices, fearing that any attempt to do so would lead to a Greek Catholic equivalent of the 1666 Schism within the Russian Orthodox Church.

De-latinization in the UGCC gained further momentum with the 1964 decree Orientalium Ecclesiarum of the Second Vatican Council and several subsequent documents. Latinizations were discarded within the Ukrainian diaspora, while among Byzantine Catholics in Western Ukraine, forced into a clandestine existence following the Soviet ban on the UGCC, the latinizations remained, "an important component of their underground practices". In response, some priests, nuns, and candidates for the priesthood found themselves, "forced towards the periphery of the church since 1989 because of their wish to 'keep the tradition'." In some eparchies, particularly those of Ivano-Frankivsk and Ternopil-Zboriv, the bishops would immediately suspend any priest who, "displayed his inclination toward 'traditionalist' practices".

Vlad Naumescu reports that an article in the February 2003 issue of Patriayarkhat, the official journal of the Ukrainian Greek Catholic Church, written by a student of the Ukrainian Catholic University, which since its 1994 foundation has been "the strongest progressive voice within the Church". The article named priests and parishes in every eparchy in Ukraine as being involved in "a well-organized movement" and who described themselves as "traditionalists". According to the article, they constituted "a parallel structure" with connections with the Society of St. Pius X and with a charismatic leader in Father Basil Kovpak, the pastor of St. Peter and Paul's Church in the suburb of Lviv-Riasne.

According to Vlad Naumescu, "Religious life in a traditionalist parish followed the model of the 'underground church.' Devotions were more intense, with each priest promoting his parish as a 'place of pilgrimage' for the neighboring areas, thus drawing larger crowds on Sunday than his local parish could provide. On Sundays and feast days, religious services took place three times a day (in Riasne), and the Sunday liturgy lasted for two and a half to three hours. The main religious celebrations took place outside the church in the middle of the neighborhood, and on every occasion traditionalists organized long processions through the entire locality. The community was strongly united by its common opponent, re-enacting the model of the 'defender of faith' common to times of repression. This model, which presupposes clear-cut attitudes and a firm moral stance, mobilized the community and reproduced the former determination of the 'underground' believers."

=== Priestly Society of Saint Josaphat ===
The Priestly Society of Saint Josaphat (SSJK), which operates a seminary, Basilian convent, and numerous parishes, receives priestly orders from the bishops of the SSPX. Its superior, Father Basil Kovpak, has accused the UGCC hierarchy of using intense psychological pressure against priests who are reluctant or unwilling to de-Latinise.

In 2003, Cardinal Liubomyr Huzar, Major Archbishop of Kyiv-Galicia, excommunicated Kovpak, but this act was later declared null and void by the Roman Rota due to lack of canonical form.

On 22 November 2006, Bishop Richard Williamson, who was then a member of the Society of St. Pius X (SSPX), ordained two priests and seven deacons in Warsaw, Poland, for the SSJK. Father John Jenkins, an SSPX priest who was present, later remarked, "We were all very edified by their piety, and I myself was astonished by the resemblance of the atmosphere amongst the seminarians with that which I knew in the seminary – this in spite of the difference of language, nationality and even rite."

Archeparch Ihor Vozniak of Lviv, the archeparchy in which the PSSJ is most active, denounced the ordinations as a "criminal act" and condemned Kovpak's participation in the ceremony. He stressed that the two priests whom Williamson had ordained would not receive faculties within the archeparchy. Officials of the Lviv archdiocese said that Kovpak could face excommunication, and that "'he deceives the church by declaring that he is a Greek (Byzantine) Catholic priest,' while supporting a group [SSPX] that uses the old Latin liturgy exclusively, eschewing the Byzantine tradition, and does not maintain allegiance to the Holy See."

Kovpak's excommunication process was restarted by the hierarchy of the Ukrainian Greek Catholic Church and was confirmed by the Congregation for the Doctrine of the Faith on 23 November 2007.

=== Sedevacantism and Conclavism in the Ukrainian Greek Catholic Church ===
In March 2008, a group of Basilian priests in Pidhirtsi, Ukraine, announced that four of them had been consecrated as bishops in order to save the Ukrainian Greek Catholic Church (UGCC) from heresy and apostasy; in August 2009, they announced the formation of the Ukrainian Orthodox Greek Catholic Church. Having elected Czech Basilian priest Anthony Elias Dohnal as "Patriarch Elijah", they declared that the Holy See was vacant, establishing the Ukrainian Orthodox Greek Catholic Church (UOGCC).

The group was promptly excommunicated by the UGCC, an act that was later confirmed by the Apostolic Signatura and the Congregation for the Doctrine of Faith.

The UOGCC later "elected" a new Pope, Archbishop Carlo Maria Viganò, the former Apostolic Nuncio to the United States, in October 2019. Whether Viganò accepted this "election" is unclear.

There have been allegations in both The New York Times and the Lviv-based newspaper Expres that the church leadership is linked to the Russian intelligence services.

== Relations with the Holy See ==
The Holy See recognises as fully legitimate the preference that many Catholics have for the earlier forms of worship. This was stated in Pope John Paul II's 1988 apostolic letter Ecclesia Dei and Pope Benedict XVI's 2007 motu proprio Summorum Pontificum. The Holy See does not extend its approval to those who oppose the present-day Church leadership, which is reiterated in Traditionis Custodes.

=== Ecclesia Dei Commission ===
The Pontifical Commission Ecclesia Dei was founded in July 1988 in the wake of John Paul II's apostolic letter Ecclesia Dei. Benedict XVI was a member of the Commission during his tenure as Cardinal Prefect of the Congregation for the Doctrine of the Faith. Speaking on 16 May 2007 to the Fifth General Conference of the Bishops of Latin America and the Caribbean, Cardinal Castrillón, the current head of the Commission, said his department had been founded for the care of those "traditionalist Catholics" who, while discontented with the liturgical reform of the Second Vatican Council, had broken with Archbishop Marcel Lefebvre "because they disagreed with his schismatic action in ordaining Bishops without the required papal mandate". He added that at present the Commission's activity is not limited to the service of those Catholics, nor to "the efforts undertaken to end the regrettable schismatic situation and secure the return of those brethren belonging to the Fraternity of Saint Pius X to full communion." It extends also, he said, to "satisfying the just aspirations of people, unrelated to the two aforementioned groups, who, because of their specific sensitiveness, wish to keep alive the earlier Latin liturgy in the celebration of the Eucharist and the other sacraments."

In 2019, Pope Francis suppressed this commission and transferred its responsibilities directly to the Congregation for the Doctrine of the Faith.

== Validity of holy orders ==
According to the Catholic Church, the conferring of holy orders may be valid but illicit. The Catholic Church considers the orders of traditionalist clergy who are in good standing with the Holy See, such as the clergy of the Priestly Fraternity of Saint Peter or the Institute of Christ the King Sovereign Priest, to be both valid and licit. It saw as valid but illicit the orders of the bishops and priests of the Society of Saint Pius X after the remission of four excommunicated bishops by Pope Benedict until the excommunication of the entire order by Pope Leo XIV in 2026.

The Holy See declared devoid of canonical effect the consecration ceremony conducted by Archbishop Pierre Martin Ngô Đình Thục for the Carmelite Order of the Holy Face group on December 31, 1975, while expressly refraining from pronouncing on its validity. It made the same statement with regard also to any later ordinations that those bishops might confer, saying that:

as for those who have already thus unlawfully received ordination or any who may yet accept ordination from these, whatever may be the validity of the orders (quidquid sit de ordinum validitate), the Church does not and will not recognise their ordination (ipsorum ordinationem), and will consider them, for all legal effects, as still in the state in which they were before, except that the [...] penalties remain until they repent.

== Demographics ==
In 2005, Catholic World News reported that "the Vatican" estimated the number of those served by the Fraternity of St Peter, the Society of St Pius X and similar groups at "close to 1 million".

== List of groups ==
This is a list of notable traditionalist Catholic groups. Some are in full communion with the Holy See; some have irregular status according to doctrines and disciplines of the Catholic Church.

As of 2023, the largest priestly communities described as traditionalist are Society of Saint Pius X (SSPX) with 707 priests, Priestly Fraternity of Saint Peter (FSSP) with 368 priests, Institute of Christ the King Sovereign Priest (ICKSP) with 147 priests and Institute of the Good Shepherd (IBP) with 61 priests.

=== Canonically regular traditionalist groups ===
- Canons Regular of Saint John Cantius
- Canons Regular of the New Jerusalem
- Foederatio Internationalis Una Voce
- Fœderatio Internationalis Juventutem
- Fraternity of Saint Vincent Ferrer
- Heralds of the Gospel
- Institute of Christ the King Sovereign Priest
- Institute of the Good Shepherd
- Latin Mass Society of England and Wales
- Militia Templi; The Poor Knights of Christ also called the Order of the Poor Knights of Christ
- Personal Apostolic Administration of Saint John Mary Vianney
- Priestly Fraternity of St. Peter
- Slaves of the Immaculate Heart of Mary (Still River, Massachusetts group only)

=== Canonically irregular traditionalist groups ===
- Society of Saint Pius X
- Fraternite Notre Dame
- Servants of the Holy Family
- Priestly Society of Saint Josaphat
- Missionaries of St. John the Baptist in Park Hills, Kentucky

=== Independent groups ===
- Canonical Old Roman Catholic Church

=== Sedevacantist groups ===
- Congregation of Mary Immaculate Queen
- Most Holy Family Monastery
- Society of Saint Pius V

=== Sedeprivationist groups ===
- Istituto Mater Boni Consilii
- Orthodox Roman Catholic Movement

=== Conclavist groups ===
- Palmarian Christian Church
- Ukrainian Orthodox Greek Catholic Church
- Vatican in Exile under Pope Michael II

== See also ==
=== Doctrinal and liturgical issues ===
- Cafeteria Catholicism
- Extra Ecclesiam nulla salus
- Feeneyism
- Mass of Paul VI

=== Comparable phenomena in other churches ===
- Old Believers, a comparable phenomenon in the Russian Orthodox Church which dates back to the 17th century
- True Orthodoxy, Old Calendarism and the Catacomb Church—comparable phenomena in the Eastern Orthodox Church that date to the 1920s
- Continuing Anglican movement, a comparable phenomenon in the Anglican Communion
- Confessing Movement, a similar movement in Mainline Protestant denominations

=== Other ===
- Old Catholicism, which started in comparable circumstances surrounding papal infallibility and the First Vatican Council
- Independent Catholicism
- Freedom of religion in Germany § Censorship, for a discussion about a traditionalist Catholic news service which was shut down
- The Remnant – an American newspaper dedicated to traditionalist themes
- Cardinal Newman Society, American group focused on traditional education
- Land O'Lakes Statement 1967 manifesto that angered traditionalists
- Toryism

=== Media ===
- Mass of the Ages (film series), an American documentary film series highlighting the Tridentine Mass for exposure and advocacy
