= Sedeprivationism =

Traditionalist Catholic position

Sedeprivationism is a doctrinal position within traditionalist Catholicism invented by the excommunicated Catholic theologian Michel-Louis Guérard des Lauriers which holds that the current occupant of the Holy See is a duly-elected pope, but lacks the authority and ability to teach or to govern unless he recants the changes brought by the Second Vatican Council. The doctrine asserts that since this council, occupants of the See of Peter are popes materialiter sed non formaliter, that is "materially but not formally". As such, sedeprivationists teach that all popes since Pope John XXIII have not 'attained the fullness of the papacy'.

Sedeprivationism is taught by a very small number of traditionalist Catholic groups such as the Istituto Mater Boni Consilii and Orthodox Roman Catholic Movement, among others.

== Etymology ==
The etymology of the term sedeprivationist means there is a privation in the occupant of the chair (sede in Latin) of Saint Peter, i.e. something lacking.

American sedeprivationist Donald Sanborn has called the name "completely dumb". He said in 2009:

it means that there is a privation of the seat when you say Sede Privata. It's as if there's a privation of the seat; there's no privation of the seat. Or it could mean that the seat is in a state of privation. But neither of these things is true. We're saying that the seat is occupied materially but not formally, and that means that Ratzinger [i.e. Pope Benedict XVI] is in possession of a formal election but he is not in possession of the power to rule and teach and sanctify.

== History ==
The doctrine of sedeprivationism was invented by the French Dominican theologian Michel-Louis Guérard des Lauriers (1898–1988). He called his thesis the 'Thesis of Cassiciacum', because it was first published in the first issue of a now-defunct magazine called Cahiers de Cassiciacum ("Notes from Cassiciacum"), in 1979. He was excommunicated in 1983.

== Theory ==
The theory states that all popes, including and after Pope John XXIII, were or are Pope only materially and not formally. Although John XXIII never 'fully' became Pope, he equally has never forfeited his claim on the papacy.

The theory states that the See of Peter is 'not obtained' unless a candidate satisfies both these requirements:

1. The pope must be elected legitimately by valid designated electors. That aspect designates the papal candidate as materially elected and designated candidate to the office of pope.
2. The newly chosen pope-elect must express his acceptance and that on giving his assent he receives from Christ the form of the papacy: the indefectible power or authority promised to Saint Peter and his successors by which the elected candidate formally becomes pope and actually takes hold of the office of the papacy.

The theory holds that John XXIII and all his successors have only satisfied the first of these requirements and not the second. Thus they did not hold the papal office except by right of designation because of a failure to receive the form of the papacy (i.e. the authority) because his acceptance is impeded by a defective intention arising from their manifest disposition of apostasy.

In explaining the position of sedeprivationism, sedevacantist bishop Donald Sanborn writes:

Because the power of designation to office pertains to the purely legal and material side of authority, the Novus Ordites (Note: Sanborn presumably uses this a pejorative epithet to refer to the prelates of the Catholic Church who celebrate the Novus Ordo Missæ.) possess the power to legitimately designate to positions of power, until such time as this power is legally removed from them.

As a result, there is a material hierarchy in place, i.e., someone legally nominated to be a pope, and others legally nominated to be bishops, and others legally nominated to be electors of popes, but none of these has any jurisdiction, and obedience is owed to none of them. Because they lack the authority, which is the form which makes them to be what they are, Ratzinger is a false pope and the bishops are false bishops. The cardinals are true electors, to the extent that they are legally nominated to be designators of the pope. But their role pertains to the material order of authority, the order of designation only.

== Differences with sedevacantism ==
Sedevacantists assert a vacancy in the papal office. Whereas sedevacantists believe that heretics and other non-Catholics are prevented by divine law from holding any office or privilege in the Church, sedeprivationists do not; rather, they insist that non-Catholics are still able to retain offices or privileges such as papal elector or Cardinal.

== See also ==
- Independent Catholicism
