= Sontheim, Bavaria =

Sontheim
- Municipality
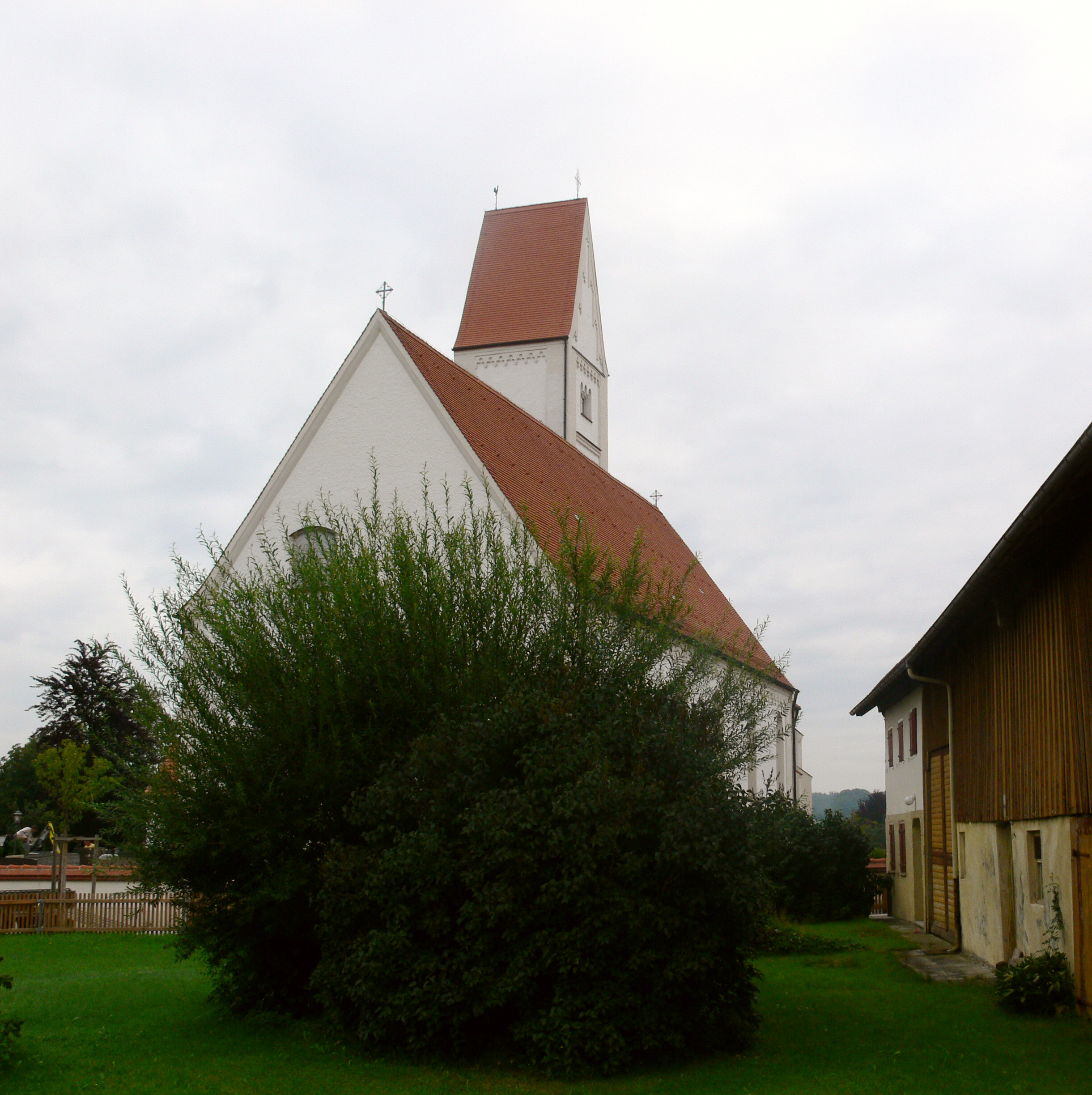
- Parish church

- Coat of arms

- Location of Sontheim within Unterallgäu district
- Interactive map of Sontheim
- Location within Germany Location within Bavaria
- Coordinates: 48°0′N 10°21′E
- Country: Germany
- State: Bavaria
- Admin. region: Schwaben
- District: Unterallgäu

Government
  - Mayor (2020–26): Alfred Gänsdorfer

Area
  - Total: 26.52 km^{2} (10.24 sq mi)
- Elevation: 620 m (2,030 ft)

Population (2025-12-31)
  - Total: 2,794
  - Density: 105.4/km^{2} (272.9/sq mi)
- Time zone: UTC+01:00 (CET)
  - Summer (DST): UTC+02:00 (CEST)
- Postal codes: 87776
- Dialling codes: 08336
- Vehicle registration: MN
- Website: www.sontheim.de

Sontheim (German pronunciation: [ˈzɔnthaɪm]) is a municipality in the district of Unterallgäu in Bavaria, Germany.
