= Orthodox Roman Catholic Movement =

American Traditionalist Catholic group of priests

- Abbreviation: ORCM
- Formation: 1973
- Dissolved: 1986
- Purpose: Traditionalist Catholicism
- Key people: Francis E. Fenton; Robert McKenna

The Orthodox Roman Catholic Movement (ORCM) was an American Traditionalist Catholic group of priests founded by Fr. Francis E. Fenton that existed from 1973 to 1986.

== History ==
The principal founding member of the ORCM was Fr. Francis E. Fenton, a Roman Catholic priest who had been the pastor of Blessed Sacrament Church, Bridgeport, Connecticut. Fenton was a leading member of the John Birch Society and sat on its National Council.

By fall 1975, in addition to Fenton, the ORCM had attracted 11 priests, including Paul Marceau, Robert McKenna, Charles P. Donohue, Leo M. Carley, Daniel E. Jones, the English Benedictine Placid White, and Joseph Gorecki. It held services in California, Colorado, Florida, New Jersey and New York.
