= Raveau =

- Commune
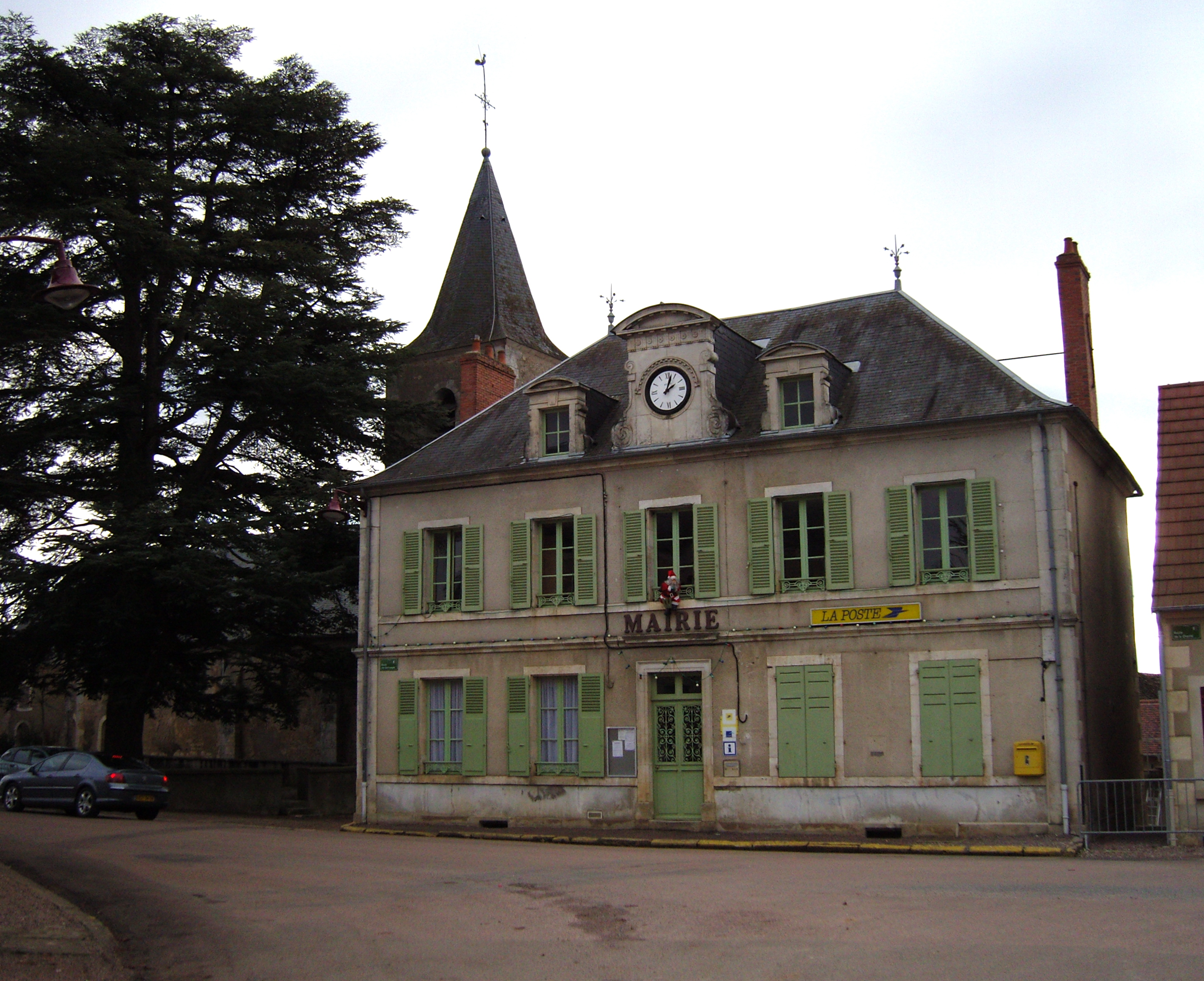
- The town hall in Raveau
- Location of Raveau
- Location within France Location within Bourgogne-Franche-Comté
- Coordinates: 47°11′14″N 3°04′39″E
- Country: France
- Region: Bourgogne-Franche-Comté
- Department: Nièvre
- Arrondissement: Cosne-Cours-sur-Loire
- Canton: La Charité-sur-Loire

Government
  - Mayor (2020–2026): Robert Maujonnet
- Area^{1}: 35.50 km^{2} (13.71 sq mi)
- Highest elevation: 332 m (1,089 ft)
- Lowest elevation: 173 m (568 ft)
- Population (2023): 594
  - Density: 16.7/km^{2} (43.3/sq mi)
- Time zone: UTC+01:00 (CET)
  - Summer (DST): UTC+02:00 (CEST)
- INSEE/Postal code: 58220 /58400
- ^{1} French Land Register data, which excludes lakes, ponds, glaciers > 1 km^{2} (0.386 sq mi or 247 acres) and river estuaries.

Raveau (French pronunciation: [ʁavo]) is a commune in the Nièvre department in central France.

It is located near La Charité-sur-Loire, close to the river Loire and the border with the Cher department.

The parish church is dedicated to Saint-Gilles et Saint-Leu. Parts of the building, including the main doorway with a statue of St Antony, date back to 1052.

== Demographics ==
Historical population
Year	Pop.	±% p.a.
1968	576	—
1975	550	−0.66%
1982	618	+1.68%
1990	705	+1.66%
1999	717	+0.19%
2007	663	−0.97%
2012	704	+1.21%
2017	673	−0.90%
2023	594	−2.06%
Source: INSEE

== Notable people ==
- François Gagnepain (1866–1952), botanist

== See also ==
- Communes of the Nièvre department
