= Josephat =

Josephat may refer to:

- Josephat Ababu (born 1980), Kenyan cricketer
- Josephat T. Benoit (1900–1976), American politician
- Josephat Karanja (1931–1994), Kenyan politician
- Josephat Kiprono (born 1973), Kenyan distance and marathon runner
- Josephat Kuntsevich (1580–1623), monk and archbishop of the Ukrainian Greek Catholic Church
- Josephat Machuka (born 1973), Kenyan runner
- Josephat Kiprono Menjo (born 1979), Kenyan long-distance runner
- Josephat Koli Nanok, Kenyan politician
- Josephat Ndambiri (born 1985), Kenyan long-distance runner
- Josephat Torner, Tanzanian albino activist

== See also ==
- Josaphat (disambiguation)
- Josepha, a surname
- Jehoshaphat (9th century BC), king of the Kingdom of Judah
