= Josaphat =

Josaphat can refer to:

== People ==
- Jehoshaphat, in the Bible, fourth king of the Kingdom of Judah
- Saint Josephat, one of:
  - Josaphat, a Christian saint of India, appearing in the legend of Barlaam and Josaphat
    - Yuz Asaf, Arabic and Urdu variations of his name
  - Josaphat Kuntsevych (c.1580 – 1623), Belarusian martyr and saint of the Ruthenian Catholic Church; St. Josaphat, Bishop and Martyr in the current Roman Calendar
- Giosafat Barbaro (1413–94), Venetian explorer and diplomat
- Josephat T. Benoit (1900–76), mayor of Manchester, New Hampshire
- Josaphat Celestin, Haitian-American politician, North Miami's first black mayor
- Josaphat Chichkov (1884 – 1952), Bulgarian priest and martyr
- J.-J. Gagnier (Jean-Josaphat Gagnier, 1885 – 1949), Canadian conductor, composer, and musician
- Josaphata Hordashevska (1869 – 1919), Ukrainian Greek-Catholic nun
- Josaphat Kotsylovsky (1917 – 1947, Ukrainian: Йосафат Йосиф Коциловський), Ukrainian Greek Catholic bishop and martyr
- Josaphat-Robert Large (1942 – 2017), Haitian-American poet, novelist and art critic
- Josafat Mendes, Swedish professional footballer
- Israel Beer Josaphat, the birth name of Paul Reuter (1816 – 1899), founder of a news agency
- Josaphat (Metropolis) is a main character in Fritz Lang's Metropolis (1927 film)
- Josafat Shanghala, bishop emeritus of the Evangelical Lutheran Church in Namibia
- Iosafat Snagoveanu (1797 - 1892), Wallachian revolutionary and monk of the Romanian Orthodox Church

== Churches ==
- St. Josaphat Cathedral (disambiguation)
- St. Josaphat's Church (disambiguation)

== Other places ==
- Valley of Josaphat, mentioned in the biblical book of Joel
- Josaphat Park, a public park located in the municipality of Schaerbeek in Brussels
- Planet Nine, which has been called by its original proponents: "Jehoshaphat", "George", and "Phattie".

== Other uses ==
- Barlaam and Josaphat (book), several books dealing with the lives of Saints Barlaam and Josaphat
- Order of Saint Basil the Great, also known as the Basilian Order of Saint Josaphat, monastic religious order of the Greek Catholic Church
- Priestly Society of Saint Josaphat
- Ukrainian Catholic Eparchy of Saint Josaphat in Parma, a diocese of the Ukrainian Greek Catholic Church

== See also ==
- Jehoshaphat (disambiguation)
