= Joasaph =

Joasaph (Greek: Ιωάσαφ; Bulgarian: Йоа́саф ; Russian: Иоаса́ф, romanized: Ioasaf) is a masculine given name. Joasaph is another name for Josaphat, the legendary martyred prince in the story of Barlaam and Josaphat; according to E. A. Wallis Budge, this name Joasaph ultimately originated as a mistranslation of Bodhisattva. The Ethiopic form of the name is Yewasef. People with this name include:

- John VI Kantakouzenos (1292–1382), Byzantine emperor from 1347 to 1354, assumed the name Joasaph Christodoulos after his retirement to a monastery
- Joasaph I of Constantinople (fl. 1460s), Ecumenical Patriarch of Constantinople
- Joasaphus, Metropolitan of Moscow (died 1556), Metropolitan of Moscow from 1539 to 1542
- Joasaph II of Constantinople (fl. 1550s–1560s), Ecumenical Patriarch of Constantinople
- Patriarch Joasaphus I of Moscow (died 1640), Patriarch of Moscow and All Russia from 1634 to 1640
- Joasaph of Belgorod (1705–1754), bishop of Belgorod
- Joasaph Bolotov (1760–1799), Russian Orthodox missionary in Alaska
- Ioasaf Tikhomirov (1872–1908), Russian actor
- Joasaph Leliukhin (1903–1966), Metropolitan of Kiev and Galicia and Exarch of Ukraine
- Joasaph (McLellan) (1962–2009), Head of the Russian Ecclesiastical Mission in Jerusalem of the Russian Orthodox Church Outside Russia

== See also ==
- Josaphat (disambiguation)
