= Kovpak =

Kovpak (Ukrainian: Ковпак) is a surname. Notable people with the surname include:

- Basil Kovpak (born 1967), Ukrainian priest
- Lev Kovpak (born 1978), Russian politician
- Oleksandr Kovpak (born 1983), Ukrainian footballer
- Sydir Kovpak (1887–1967), Soviet partisan
