= St. Josaphat's Church =

St. Josaphat's Church may refer to:

== Canada ==
- St. Josaphat Cathedral, McCauley, Edmonton, Alberta,

== Poland ==
- Church of St. Josaphat, Lublin

== United States ==
- St. Josaphat Roman Catholic Church (Chicago)
- St. Josaphat Roman Catholic Church, Detroit, Michigan
- St. Josaphat Ukrainian Catholic Cathedral (Parma, Ohio)
- St. Josaphat Roman Catholic Church in Philadelphia, Pennsylvania
- St. Josaphat Ukrainian Catholic Church, Philadelphia, Pennsylvania
- Basilica of St. Josaphat, Milwaukee, Wisconsin

== See also ==
- Josaphat Kuntsevych
