= Gedeon Brolnitskyj =

- Church: Ruthenian Uniate Church
- Installed: 26 May 1601
- Term ended: 1618
- Predecessor: Herman Zahorskyj
- Successor: Saint Josaphat Kuntsevych

Orders
- Consecration: 6 August 1601 by Herman Zahorskyj

Personal details
- Born: 1528
- Died: 1618 (aged 89–90)

Gedeon Brolnitskyj (Polish: Gedeon Brolnicki; 1528–1618) was a bishop of the Ruthenian Uniate Church and a monk belonged to the Lauryshava Monastery and since 1601 Archbishop of Polotsk.

== Biography ==
In 1596 Brolnitskyj was an Orthodox Archimandrite of the Lauryshava Monastery (in today's Belarus) and converted from Orthodoxy to Greek Catholicism, signing an act of the Union of Brest.

On May 26, 1601 Gideon Brolicki was nominated Archbishop of Polotsk. On August 6, 1601, he was ordained bishop and remained as Catholic Uniate bishop till his death in 1618.
