= Harvard Library of Early Ukrainian Literature =

Publication series

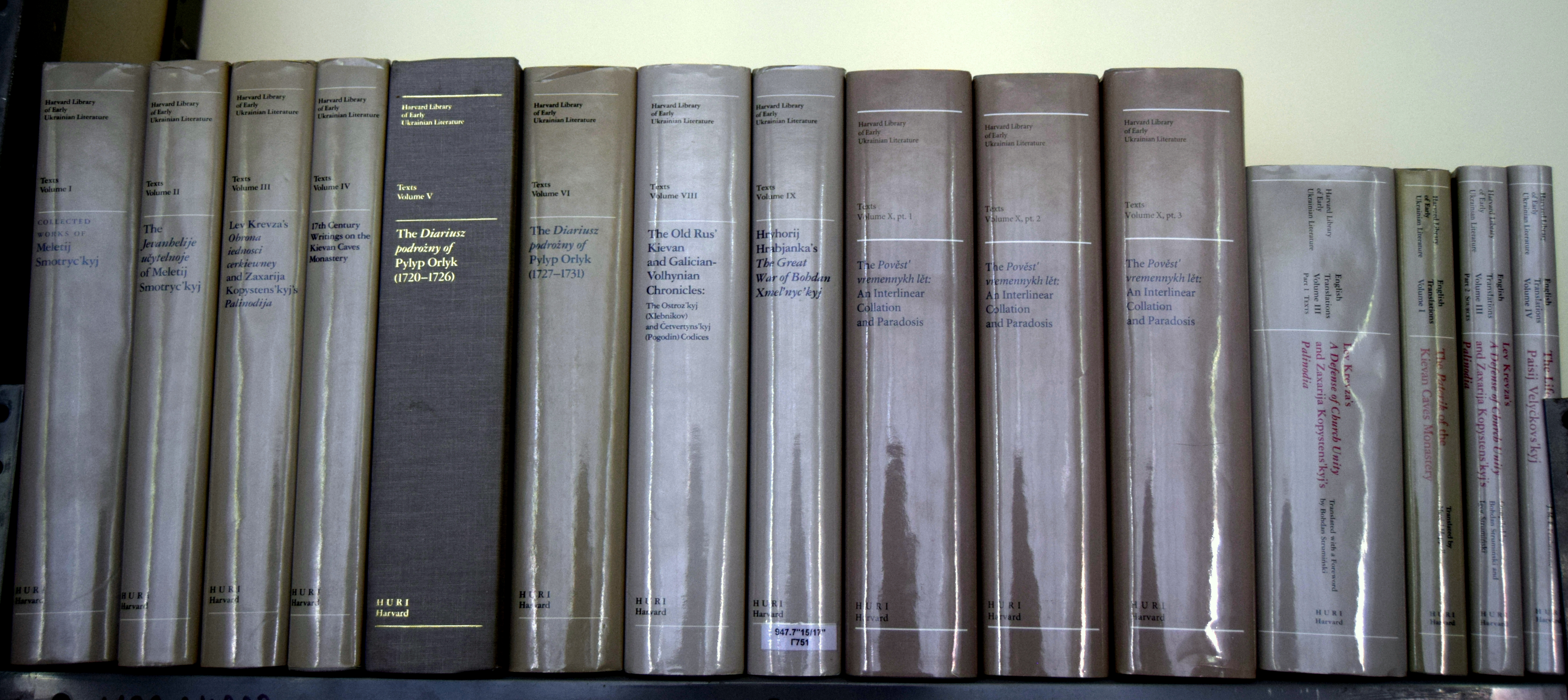
Set of published volumes

The Harvard Library of Early Ukrainian Literature is a publication series published by Harvard Ukrainian Research Institute as a part of the Harvard Project in Commemoration of the Millennium of Christianity in Rus'-Ukraine. The publication was intended to include the main Ukrainian literary works from mid-eleventh century through the end of the eighteenth century. The project produced three subseries: texts corpus written in a variety of languages as facsimile, a corpus of English translations with introductory essays and commentaries, translations into modern Ukrainian language. Initially, each of the subseries was planned to result in 40 volumes.

Series made available texts have been accessible only to select researchers because of geographical locations of manuscripts.

The project was initiated and launched by Omeljan Pritsak in 1987, and was financed by donations from the Ukrainian diaspora in North America. The scientist was convinced that the project was a matter of national dignity and mobilized the Ukrainian community in America to support the research and publication on the occasion of the Millennium of Christianity.

List of in-print facsimile

- volume 1 (1989) Collected Works of Meletius Smotrytsky
- volume 2 (1987) The Jevanhelije ucytelnoje of Meletius Smotrytsky
- volume 3 (1995) Lev Krevza’s A defense of church unity; and Zaxarija Kopystens’kyj’s Palinodia., Parts 1 and 2
- volume 4 (1988) Seventeenth-Century Writings on the Kievan Caves Monastery
- volume 5 (1989)The Diariusz podrozny of Pylyp Orlyk: 1720–1726
- volume 6 (1988) The Diariusz podrozny of Pylyp Orlyk: 1727–1731
- volume 8 (1990) The Old Rus’ Kievan and Galician-Volhynian Chronicles: The Ostroz’kyj (Xlebnikov) and Cetvertyns’kyj (Pogodin) Codices
- volume 9 (1991) The Great War of The Great War of Bohdan Xmel’nyc’kyi
- volume 10 (2004) The Pověst’ vremennykh lět: An Interlinear Collation and Paradosis parts 1, 2, 3

List of in-print English translations

- volume 1 (1989) The Paterik of the Kievan Caves Monastery
- volume 2 (1992) The Hagiography of Kievan Rus
- volume 3 (1995) Lev Krevza’s A defense of church unity; and Zaxarija Kopystens’kyj’s Palinodia., Parts 1 and 2
- volume 4 (1990) The Life of Paisij Velyckovs'kyj
- volume 5 (1991) Sermons and Rhetoric of Kievan Rus'
- volume 6 (1994) The Edificatory Prose of Kievan Rusʹ
- volume 7 (2005) Rus’ Restored: Selected Writings of Meletij Smotryc'kyj

Corpus of translations into modern Ukrainian language saw only two volume edition of Hryhorii Skovoroda texts in 1994.

== Reviews ==
- Worth, Dean S. (1995). "The Hagiography of Kievan Rus'. Trans. Paul Hollingsworth. Harvard Library of Early Ukrainian Literature, vol. 2. Cambridge: Harvard University Press, 1992. xcvi, 267 pp. 17.00, paper". Slavic Review. 54 (2): 529–531. doi:10.2307/2501707. ISSN 0037-6779.
- Pugh, Stefan M. (1988). "Review of Harvard Library of Early Ukrainian Literature. Vol. 1, Collected Works of Meletij Smotryc'kyj.; Harvard Library of Early Ukrainian Literature. Vol. 2, The Jevanhelije ucitelnoe of Meletij Smotryc'kyj.; Harvard Library of Early Ukrainian Literature. Vol. 3, Lev Krevza's Obrona iednosci cerkiewney and Zaxarija Kopystens'kyj's Palinodija". The Sixteenth Century Journal. 19 (4): 707–710. doi:10.2307/2541031. ISSN 0361-0160.
- Prestel, David K. (1990). "Review of The Paterik of the Kievan Caves Monastery". The Russian Review. 49 (4): 492–494. doi:10.2307/130536. ISSN 0036-0341.
