= Jehoshaphat (disambiguation) =

Jehoshaphat, son of Asa, was the fourth king of Judah according to 1 Kings 15:24 in the Hebrew Bible.

Jehoshaphat may also refer to:

- Jehoshaphat the Recorder, son of Ahilud, a scribe who appears in 2 Samuel 8:16 and 2 Samuel 20:24.
- Jehoshaphat, son of Paruah, Solomon's administrator in Issachar, who appears in 1 Kings 4:17
- Jehoshaphat (high priest), High Priest of Israel
- Valley of Josaphat, a Biblical place
- Jehoshaphat (father of Jehu), the father of King Jehu of Israel, the son of Nimshi and the grandson of Omri.
- Jehoshaphat ben Josiah, 9th century religious figure
- Boaz ben Jehoshaphat, his son
- One of the proposed names for Planet Nine

== See also ==
- Josaphat (disambiguation)
