= Herman Zahorskyj =

Roman Catholic archbishop

- Church: Roman Catholic Church; Ecumenical Patriarchate of Constantinople
- Metropolis: Ruthenian Uniate Church; Kyiv, Galicia and all Rus
- Diocese: Polotsk
- See: Polotsk
- Elected: 19 October 1596
- Term ended: 1600
- Predecessor: new post (catholic); Natanail Selitsky (eastern orthodox)
- Successor: Gedeon Brolnitskyj (catholic); Meletius Smotrytsky (eastern orthodox)

Orders
- Ordination: 1595 by Michael Rohoza

Personal details
- Died: 1600

Herman Zahorskyj (died 1600 or 1601) was a bishop of the Ruthenian Uniate Church. Since 1595 he was Archbishop of Polotsk (originally Orthodox) and in 1596 accepted the Union of Brest, became Greek Catholic.

== Biography ==
Zahorskyj was named as coadjutor on May 5, 1595, for the Archeparchy of Polotsk. Since July 1595 (after the death of the previous bishop of Polotsk Natanail Selitsky) he assumed the function of the ordinary of the Polotsk eparch. On September 22, 1595, the Polish king Sigismund III Vasa named him archbishopric of Polotsk. In 1594 - 1595, Hermann Zahorskyj signed Uniate documents as "nominated" to the archbishop of Polotsk.

On 19 October 1596 he was one of those Orthodox hierarchs who supported and signed the act of the Union of Brest, formally became a Greek Catholic bishop till his death in 1600 or 1601.

== Literature ==
- T. Kempa: Prawosławie i unia we wschodnich województwach WKL w końcu XVII w. pp. 5–10.
- Блажейовський Д .: Ієрархія Київської церкви (861-1996). Львів: Каменяр, 1996. p. 281.
