= Meletius Smotrytsky =

Archbishop and writer from the Polish-Lithuanian Commonwealth

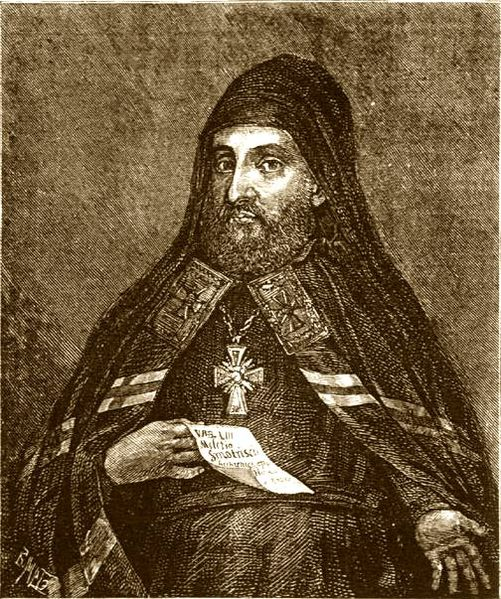
- Church: Ruthenian Uniate Church; Patriarchate of Constantinople
- Metropolis: Ruthenian Uniate Church; Kiev, Galicia and all Rus'
- Diocese: Hierapolis (titular); Polotsk
- In office: 1631–1634; 1620–1629
- Predecessor: João da Rocha; Herman Zahorskyj
- Successor: Antonio Tasca; Joasaph

Orders
- Ordination: October 1620 (bishop) by Theophanes III (Jerusalem)
- Rank: Archbishop (1620)

Personal details
- Born: Maksym Herasymovych Smotrytsky c. 1577 Smotrycz, Podolian Voivodeship, Poland (now Khmelnytskyi Oblast, Ukraine)
- Died: 27 December 1633 (aged 55–56) Derman village, Volhynian Voivodeship, Poland (now Rivne Oblast, Ukraine)
- Buried: Derman Monastery
- Denomination: Eastern Orthodox later Ruthenian Uniate Church
- Education: Ostroh Academy; Vilnius University (1600)

Meletius Smotrytsky (Ukrainian: Мелетій Смотрицький, romanized: Meletii Smotrytskyi; Belarusian: Мялецій Сматрыцкі, romanized: Mialiecij Smatrycki Russian: Мелетий Смотрицкий, romanized: Melety Smotritsky Polish: Melecjusz Smotrycki; c. 1577 – 17 or 27 December 1633), Archbishop of Polotsk (Metropolitan of Kiev), was a writer, religious and pedagogical activist of the Polish–Lithuanian Commonwealth, and Ruthenian linguist whose works influenced the development of the Eastern Slavic languages. His book Slavonic Grammar with Correct Syntax (1619) systematized the study of Church Slavonic. It became the standard grammar book in Russia until the end of the 18th century.

== General ==
Born in Smotrycz, Podolia, Meletius was the son of the famous writer and pedagogue Herasym Smotrytsky. He received his first formal education at the Ostroh Academy, where his father was a rector. The academy is the oldest institution of higher learning in Eastern Europe. Later, he studied at Vilnius University, a Jesuit institution, between approximately 1596 and 1600. After that, Smotrytsky traveled through Europe, continuing his education at universities in Leipzig, Wittenberg, and Nuremberg.

In 1608, Meletius returned to Vilnius where he became a member of a local fraternity. Under his pen name Theophile Ortologue he wrote his famous polemic "Thrynos". Sometime in 1615-18 Smotrytsky was a teacher of Church Slavonic and Latin in the newly established Kiev Fraternity School. Subsequently, he became one of its first rectors. In 1616, he published a Ruthenian translation of "Teacher's Gospel... of Calisto" and in 1615 in Cologne he published a Greek-language grammar. In 1618, Smotrytsky returned to Vilnius where at the Holy Spirit Monastery he took vows as a monk and assumed the name Miletius. There, in the city of Vievis, he participated in publishing Dictionary of the Slavic Language (1618). Later, in 1619, he published Slavonic Grammar with Correct Syntax.

In 1620, Meletius Smotrytsky became the Archbishop of Polotsk (Metropolitan of Kiev), bishop of Vitebsk and Mstyslaw. Around that time he published several anti-Union (see Union of Brest) works for which he was persecuted by the Polish authorities. During 1624 Smotrytsky traveled to Constantinople, Egypt, Palestine, after which in 1625 he returned to Kiev.

Eventually, by 1627. he sided with followers of the Union with Rome and became the Archimandrite of the Derman Monastery. After receiving Smotrytsky's homage in Rome, Pope Urban VIII granted Smotrytsky the title of Titular Archbishop of Hierapolis. Smotrytsky is buried at the Derman Monastery.

== Conversion to Catholicism ==
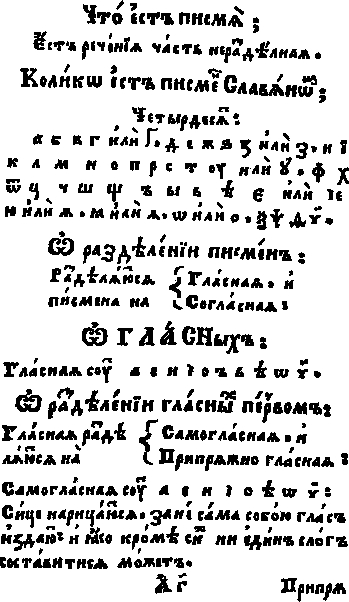
"What is a letter?..." from the first edition of Smotrytsky's grammar

Catholic and Orthodox authors have long debated Smotrytsky's reasons for abandoning Orthodoxy and converting to the Catholic Church. Catholics have argued that the conversion was a miracle based on the intercession of Martyr Saint Josaphat Kuntsevych. This explanation, first advanced by Josyf Veliamyn Rutsky, appears in the papal Bull of Pope Pius IX canonizing Kuncewicz. Smotrytysky also compared himself with Paul of Tarsus, who suddenly relapsed after the stoning of Saint Stephen. Orthodox Christians, in turn, attributed his conversion to worldly reasons: alleging that he was tempted by the money and prestige of an imminent appointment as Abbot of a Uniate monastery in Derman. The former archbishop of Polotsk was portrayed as a traitor to the true faith and was compared with Judas or Martin Luther. Against Meletius Smotrytsky a whole group of Orthodox pamphlets was written.

In his letters, Smotrytsky rarely referred to his reasons for changing his religion, contrasting instead the "old" and "new" Smotrytsky. He suggested that before his conversion he was not sure what he believed, while his adoption of Catholicism restored his confidence in this regard. He also gave different dates for his decision to accept the Union, from 1623 (before leaving for Constantinople) up to 1628. He said that since 1615 he had waged an internal battle, growing stronger in the course of writing his texts; in them he defended the Orthodox dogma with diminishing conviction, suggesting that, even before his chirotony, the bishop did not agree with the spirit of brotherhood following his anti-Uniate publication from Vilnius.

Several scholars claim that Archbishop Meletius decided to convert to the Union under the influence of disenchantment which earned him a trip to Constantinople. This decision was the result of a deep spiritual crisis and the ultimate belief that the only thing that could help the revival of the Ruthenian people and culture was binding ancient Rus' lands with the Polish–Lithuanian state, and union of the churches. Mironowicz claims that Smotrytsky's disappointing experience with a trip to two of the ancient patriarchates meant that he decided to devote all his strength to the union "of Rus" in one Uniate Church.

On July 6, 1627, Meletius Smotrytsky sent a letter to Pope Urban VIII, asking for forgiveness of his sins and acceptance into the Catholic Church. A second letter was addressed to Cardinal Ottavio Bandini, which promised that from then on he would not stray "even a hair's breadth" from the Catholic faith. On July 10, 1627, Greek Catholic Archbishop Josyf Veliamyn Rutsky was instructed in a letter from the pope to reconcile Meletius Smotrytsky. It may be that the profession of faith by a former Orthodox archbishop and polemicist was for a time kept secret. In fact, Smotrystsky asked the pope for permission to temporarily keep his Orthodox titles and functions in a separate letter sent at the same time as the letter requesting admission to the Catholic Church.

== As Uniate Bishop ==
Following the adoption of the Union Smotrytsky was a huge advocate of complete reunification of the Church. He hid the fact that he had already converted to the Union. His attitude, however, began to raise suspicions among the clergy. While retaining his popularity among the priests and faithful in Belarus, he lost trust among both the Vilnius fraternity and Kiev monks in monasteries. At the same time, Catholics were not yet convinced that Smotrytsky maintained full fidelity to his recently adopted Catholicism. On April 8, 1628, Cardinal Ludovisi in a letter to Alexander Zasławski demanded that the minister make a public profession of the Catholic faith. Smotrycki by then no longer resided in Vilnius but in a monastery in Derman.

The events that led to the final disclosure of Smotrytsky's conversion to Catholicism are known from several documents originating from himself or his Orthodox opponents. Smotrytsky claimed that for the first time after conversion, he had met with the Orthodox bishops of the Republic during the celebration of the Nativity of Our Lady in 1627 in Kiev. The meeting was also attended by Peter Mogila, who was still a layman. Mogila and Archbishop Job asked Smotrycki to show them the catechism that the Patriarch of Constantinople had presented. The next meeting of the hierarchy took place on the sixth Sunday of Lent in Horodku, on property belonging to the Kiev Pechersk Lavra. In addition to Meletius Smotrytsky, it was attended by the Metropolitan Job, Bishop Isaac of Lutsk, Chelm Paisjusz and Peter Mogila, who was already igumen in the Kiev Pechersk Lavra. Smotrytsky delivered a speech at the meeting, discussing the six basic differences between the two confessions. Then the assembled council decided to convene the Orthodox Church in Kiev; not only the clergy had taken part in it, but also representatives of the Orthodox nobility and bourgeoisie. The bishops agreed to present at the Council a draft union for the Orthodox and Uniate Churches. Hierarchs agreed thereby that contrary to earlier findings, Meletius Smotrycki published no new treaty discussing the differences between the rival churches. Smotrytsky later argued that both Metropolitan Job and Peter Mogila allowed for the conclusion of a new union.

It was not until a great anti-union stance by the Cossacks in attendance at the council to Kiev that they were prompted to change their position. Smotrycki was increasingly suspected of pro-Uniate sympathies. Therefore, after he arrived in Kiev he was not accommodated in Pechersk Lavra and had to live in the monastery of St. Michael's Golden-Domed Monastery. The priest wrote that he had been in the council visited by representatives of the Cossacks, who threatened him with death if the Orthodox hierarchy agreed to join the union. His design of a new union of churches and arguments for the introduction signed the Treaty of Apology peregrinated to Eastern countries. Discussions on Smotrytsky's projects of the union were held at the Kiev council without the participation of Cossack delegates. Smotrytsky was accused of preaching heresy, including Sabellianism and Manichaeism. Smotrytsky's works that occurred in the years 1628-1629 were also repeatedly criticized publicly by the Orthodox monks. This meant the failure of pro-union initiatives, although projects to unite the two Churches were still presented in the following years. Smotrytsky's arguments in favor of the union were presented again in 1629 and published in Paraenensis but were not supported by Orthodox Bishops.

Smotrycki was recognized as Orthodox bishop in January 1629 (Joseph Bobrykowicz was even then his deputy in the office of the monastery of Saint Spirit in Vilnius), but a few months later the Orthodox recognized him as a traitor, who renounced his former profession of private material benefits. Also, the Catholic Church immediately after the council of Kiev decided Smotrytsky was not fully devoted to the union, especially since it was still not publicly acknowledged that he had left Orthodoxy. In September 1629 Smotrytsky took part in the Orthodox-Uniate Synod in Lviv, where he had already performed at the opening of the Uniate and Orthodox negotiations to convert to Catholicism. It was his last public appearance during which he took voice on issues of religion and the position of the Ruthenian nation. Synod of Lviv, in which assumptions and the Uniate Metropolitan King were to lead to the establishment of the Republic of the Uniate Patriarchate, ended in complete failure, because neither the Orthodox hierarchy nor even sent a fraternity to Lviv agreed with their delegates.

== Archbishop of Hierapolis ==
Smotrytsky could not remain archbishop of Polotsk, as the cathedral was already planted the Uniate Church. Josyf Velamyn Rutsky even suggested granting him the title of Bishop of Halych. Finally, on June 5, 1631, Pope Urban VIII gave him the title of (titular) Archbishop of Hierapolis. Thus, the former Orthodox archbishop of Polotsk had dignity in the Catholic Church, which did not give any real powers. The reason for such a decision was that the pope could have a negative assessment of Smotrytsky's attitudes at council in Kiev, where he pleaded not guilty to his conversion. Still in 1631 Smotrytsky wrote to Rome that he would like to be bishop of a Diocese of actually running in Ruthenia. At the same time he refused to travel as a missionary to Athos, where, he said, his work would not have prospects of success. Uniate clergy in letters to Rome consistently asserted that Smotrytsky eagerly engaged in the life of the Church.

A multitude of these letters suggest, however, that for the rest of his life he remained under close supervision of the Uniate hierarchy. Smotrytsky still received letters from the brotherhood of Vilnius and from some Orthodox monks. In his letters, he appealed to the Orthodox to accept the union, as long as they were still society composed not only of peasants. In this way, they would retain certain rights and privileges. In the last four years of his life Smotrytsky did no theological work and never took the public to speak on matters connected with the Church. On February 16, 1630 Smotrytsky addressed to Pope Urban VIII, another letter in which he presented a new plan for the evolution of the Commonwealth, in which he suggested the use of force to spread the union by uniting the efforts of the Church, the State and the Catholic magnates.

Smotrytsky's ever-increasing intolerance resulted from his conviction that only by adopting the union Ruthenians would become a political nation, respected on par with Poles and Lithuanians and preserving their autonomy. He was also convinced that attachment to the Ruthenian Catholic Church could bring a moral renewal of the Orthodox Church, as the former enjoyed the greatest freedom and had the best educated clergy. Meletius Smotrytsky died on December 27, 1633. His last confessor, Jesuit Wojciech Kortycki, dedicated to his memory eulogy he delivered then print. Metropolitan Joseph Welamin Rutski claimed Smotrycki was poisoned by the Orthodox deacon, which hired a scribe. He was buried in the monastery in Derman, which remained his residence from 1627.

== Canonization discussion ==
During Josaphat Kuntsevych's beatification in 1637, Meletius Smotrytsky's beatification was also discussed because he was a persecutor of the union but changed his position to an ardent defender. Perhaps in order to popularize his candidacy for sainthood, in 1666 James Drought published a biography. The priest was after 1648 in Rome and where he could persuade the relevant authorities to consider the Smotrytsky beatification. Descriptions of supernatural events that took place after the death of Smotrytsky were given by his last confessor. According to his account he was dying to ask you to insert his hand in the coffin of Pope Urban VIII letter informing him of the receipt for the Archbishop of Hierapolis. Uniate monks but forgot about it the first time, and put a letter in the coffin just a few hours after the death of the priest. Then the hand of the deceased had to move and firmly grasp the document. His removal from the hand of the deceased was supposed to be possible only when he stood over the body, Metropolitan of Kiev and demanded the return of the letter.

In a later version of the description of the event Kortycki put the information allegedly monks put in the coffin of the letter Orthodox Patriarch of Jerusalem, but this was completely ignored. Kortycki also asserted that before the funeral of a hand holding a letter miraculously renewed, giving the impression of living. Metropolitan Rutski confirmed that the following events actually took place, and even wrote about them for the Congregation for the Propagation of the Faith in August 1634. On December 19, 1634 this congregation held a meeting during which it was decided that Smotrycki was murdered, and should be canonized as a martyr. The matter was discussed again in July 1635, and in October of the same year, a representative of the Congregation speaking to Rutsky to ask for a copy of the description posthumous miracle. In 1635 a Basilian monk named Isaiah, who was also a participant in the Smotrytsky's funeral, told the Onoratio Visconti, papal nuncio in Warsaw, that the deceased bishop kept in a coffin two lists - the papal and patriarchal. While the ultimate message of the Congregation stated that Smotrycki finally "rejected" letter of Patriarch theophany, doubts in this regard could be one of the reasons why the canonization process Smotryckiego was suspended.

== Grammar ==
Smotrytsky is best known for his Slavonic Grammar with Correct Syntax (Грамматіки славєнскиѧ правилноє Сvнтаґма, 1619), which codified what is now known as "Modern Church Slavonic" or, more specifically, "Meletian Church Slavonic". It was the sole handbook for grammar in Belarusian, Russian and Ukrainian lands, and had an enormous impact on the development of these languages. Smotrytsky's work also contributed greatly to the study of Church Slavonic texts throughout Eastern Europe. The 1619 grammar was first reprinted in 1721 and many times over later on.

Smotrytsky's work for Slavic grammar can be compared by its impact with that of Dionysius Thrax for Greek and that of Aelius Donatus and Priscian for Latin.

== Works ==
- Θρηνος to iest Lament iedyney S. powszechney apostolskiey Wschodniey Cerkwie ... - Wilno, 1610.
- Ґrammatіki Slavenskiya correctament Svntaґma ... Eve, 1619. Reprint: Kiev: Naukova Dumka, 1979. online version (scanned). Apologia. - Lions, 1628.
- Αντιγραφη (Antigrafi) / / Monuments of polemical literature. - St. Petersburg., 1903. - Pr. 3 (Russian east. Library, Vol 19). Verificatia niewinności / / AYUZR. - Part 1. - T. 7.
- Lyament in squalid svіta on zhalostnoє prestavlenіє svyatolyubivogo and oboї dobrodіtelі Bhagat husband Bozі velebnogo Mr. ottsya Leontіya Karpovich arhіmandrita obschіa obitelі at tserkvі Soshestvіya Brotherhood of the Holy Spirit Orthodox Church Vіlenskogo grecheskogo / / Pam'yatki bratskih shkіl on Ukraїnі. - K., 1988.
- Collected works of Meletij Smortyc'kyj / Harvard Library of Early Ukrainian Literature: Texts: Volume I. Cambridge (Massachusetts): Harvard University, 1987. ISBN 0-916458-20-2 .
- The Jevanhelije učytelnoje of Meletij Smotryc'kyj / Harvard Library of Early Ukrainian Literature: Texts: Volume II. Cambridge (Massachusetts): Harvard University, 1987. ISBN 0-916458-21-0 .

Catholic Church titles
| Preceded by João da Rocha, S.J. | — TITULAR — Archbishop of Hierapolis in Phrygia; 1631 – 1634 | Succeeded by Antonio Tasca |
