= Priestly Society of Saint Josaphat =

Ukrainian Traditionalist Catholic society

- Priestly Fraternity of Saint Hieromartyr Josaphat
- Священиче Братство Святого Священномученика Йосафата
- Founded: September 28, 2000; 25 years ago
- Leader: Basil Kovpak
- Affiliations: Society of Saint Pius X
- Website: https://www.saintjosaphat.org/

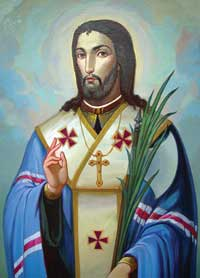
Josaphat Kuncevyc, patron saint of the society

The Priestly Society of Saint Josaphat Kuntsevych (SSJK; Ukrainian: Священиче Братство Святого Священномученика Йосафата "Priestly Fraternity of Saint Hieromartyr Josaphat", СБССЙ) is a traditionalist Catholic priestly fraternity founded in 2000 by Basil Kovpak, originating from Ukrainian Greek Catholic Church. The society is affiliated with the Society of St. Pius X whose bishops confer holy orders on its members in the Roman Rite. Its clergy, however, exclusively celebrate the Ruthenian recension of Byzantine Rite in Church Slavonic. Its members live a spiritual life under the motto “Faithful to God, the Rock of Peter, the Holy Tradition of the Greek Catholic Church, and Ukraine.”

== Seminary ==
The seminary of the SSJK is dedicated to the Immaculate Heart of Our Lady and currently is attended by thirty seminarians. The seminary, the society says, is intended to be a modest support in the conversion to Catholicism not only of Ukraine, but of Russia as well. Devotion to Our Lady of Fatima and fidelity to traditional Catholic theology (with an emphasis on pre-conciliar theological emphases) are considered important.

== Relations with the sui iuris Ukrainian Catholic Church and the Holy See ==
=== Opposition to de-Latinization ===
The SSJK rejects the de-Latinization reforms currently being strongly enforced within the Ukrainian Greek Catholic Church, which is in full communion with Rome. These reforms began with the 1930s corrections of the liturgical books by Metropolitan Andrey Sheptytsky. According to his biographer Cyril Korolevsky, however, Metropolitan Andrey opposed the use of force against liturgical Latinizers. He expressed fear that any attempt to do so would lead to a Greek Catholic equivalent of the 1666 Schism in the Russian Orthodox Church.

The de-Latinisation of the UGCC gained further momentum with the 1964 decree Orientalium Ecclesiarum of the Second Vatican Council) and several subsequent documents. This resulted in the Latinisations being discarded within the Ukrainian diaspora. The Soviet occupation of Western Ukraine had meanwhile forced Byzantine Catholics into a clandestine existence and the Latinizations continued to be used in the underground. After the prescription against the UGCC was lifted in 1989, numerous UGCC priests and hierarchs arrived from the diaspora and attempted to enforce liturgical conformity.

In his memoir Persecuted Tradition, Basil Kovpak accused the UGCC hierarchy of using intense psychological pressure against priests who are reluctant or unwilling to de-Latinize. He alleged that numerous laity, who have been attached to the Latinizations since the days of the underground, would prefer to stay home on Sunday rather than attend a de-Latinized liturgy.

The SSJK for instance opposes the removal of the Stations of the Cross, the rosary, and the monstrance from the liturgy and parishes of the Ukrainian Greek Catholic Church. In rejecting these reforms, they also reject the right of the Church authorities to make these reforms; thus who controls the format of liturgy becomes an important point of debate.

Critics of the SSJK point out that their liturgical practice favours severely abbreviated services and imported Roman Rite devotions over the traditional and authentic practices and ancient devotions of Eastern Tradition and particularly the Ukrainian Greek Catholic Church. Proponents counter that these "Latin" symbols and rituals, borrowed from the Latin liturgical practices of their Latin Catholic Polish neighbours, have long been practised by Ukrainian Greek Catholics, in some cases for centuries, and that to suppress them is to deprive the Ukrainian Catholic faithful of a part of their own sacred heritage. The central point in the dispute is over what constitutes 'organic development'.

The Holy See, however, has argued since before the Second Vatican Council that Latinization was not an organic development. Frequently cited examples of this are Pope Leo XIII's 1894 encyclical Orientalium dignitas and Saint Pius X's instructions that the priests of the Russian Catholic Church should offer the liturgy "no more, no less, and no different" (nec plus, nec minus, nec aliter) than the Orthodox and Old Ritualist clergy.

=== Church Slavonic ===
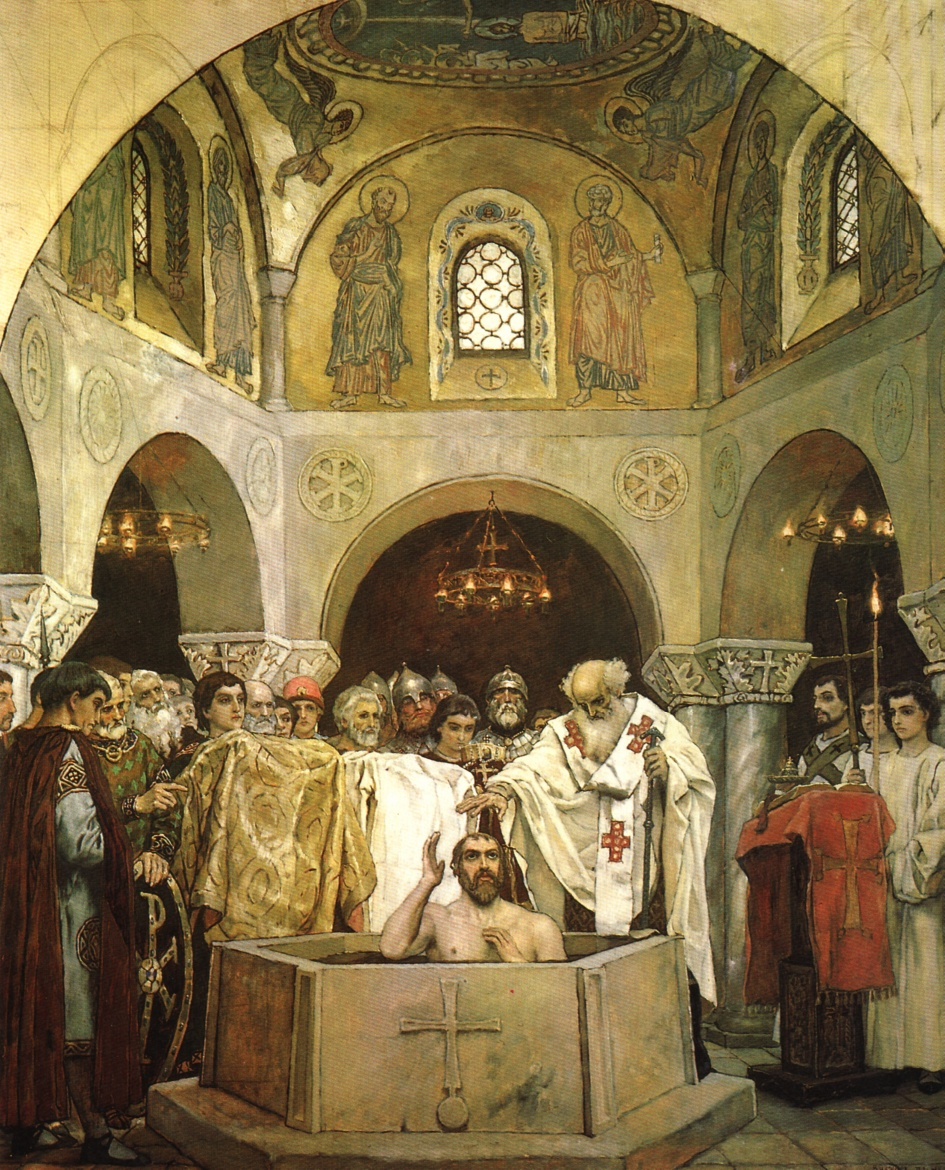
Vladimir the Great. The society declares that one of its main goals is conversion of Russia and Ukraine to unity with the Catholic Church.

The SSJK also opposes the abandonment of Church Slavonic, the traditional liturgical language of the Slavic Churches (both Orthodox and Greek-Catholic), in favour of modern Ukrainian in the Liturgy of the Ukrainian Catholic Church. The society holds that Church Slavonic is essential to stress necessary Catholic unity among all Slavic peoples, and to avoid nationalism which has for a long time divided Slavic Christians.

However, critics claim that the essence of Eastern liturgical practice is to pray in a language which is understood by the people, and that Church Slavonic has ceased to be such a language, becoming a pale imitation of the Western practice of using Latin to promote unity. The Ukrainian Greek-Catholic Church has a large presence in many non-Slavic countries, with numerous eparchies and parishes in the diaspora, exacerbating the problem of parishioners not understanding what is being celebrated as well as raising issues of assimilation.

=== Ecumenism ===
The Society of Saint Josaphat condemns ecumenism with the Orthodox currently practised by both the Holy See and the Ukrainian Catholic Church. Instead the society promotes Catholic missionary activities among the Orthodox, who are not in communion with the Holy See. In Persecuted Tradition, Basil Kovpak cites numerous examples of the UGCC turning away Orthodox clergy and laity who wish to convert. In many cases, he alleges, this is because the converts are not ethnically Ukrainian.

=== Attempted excommunication ===
In 2003, Cardinal Lubomyr Husar excommunicated SSJK superior Kovpak from the Ukrainian Greek Catholic Church. Kovpak appealed this punishment at the Apostolic Tribunal of the Roman Rota in Vatican City and the excommunication was declared null and void by reason of a lack of canonical form.

== Ordinations in 2006 ==
On 22 November 2006, Bishop Richard Williamson, who was then a member of the Society of St. Pius X (SSPX), ordained two priests and seven deacons in Warsaw, Poland, for the SSJK, in violation of canon 1015 §2, and of canons 1021 and 1331 §2 of the Code of Canon Law, and the corresponding canons of the Code of Canons of the Eastern Churches. An SSPX priest who was present remarked, "We were all very edified by their piety, and I myself was astonished by the resemblance of the atmosphere amongst the seminarians with that which I knew in the seminary – this in spite of the difference of language, nationality and even rite."

Archbishop Ihor Vozniak of Lviv (the archdiocese in which Kovpak is incardinated) denounced Williamson's action as a "criminal act" and condemned Kovpak's participation in the ceremony. He stressed that the two priests that Williamson had ordained would not receive faculties within the archeparchy. Officials of the Lviv archdiocese said that Kovpak could face excommunication, and that "'he deceives the church by declaring that he is a Greek (Byzantine) Catholic priest', while supporting a group [SSPX] that uses the old Latin liturgy exclusively, eschewing the Byzantine tradition, and does not maintain allegiance to the Holy See." Accordingly, Kovpak's excommunication process was restarted by the hierarchy of the Ukrainian Greek-Catholic Church and confirmed by the Congregation for the Doctrine of the Faith on 23 November 2007.

Father John Jenkins, a priest of the Society of St. Pius X, said in 2006 that the new archbishop of Lviv declared that his main task for the following year was to eradicate the "Lefebvrists" from his territory.

== Position of the society ==
Although the Ukrainian Greek Catholic Church, with the backing of the Holy See, had thus declared Kovpak excommunicated and the Society of St. Josaphat lacking faculties for a ministry within the Catholic Church, they themselves maintain that, though they are in dispute with Lubomyr and, presumably, with his successor, Sviatoslav Shevchuk, and through their association with the Society of St Pius X, indirectly in dispute with the church hierarchy, they are loyal to the Pope and the Ukrainian Greek Catholic Church, and are merely resisting what they consider to be modernism, indifferentism, and liberalism.
