= Latinisation of liturgy =

Process of adoption of Latin liturgical rites by non-Latin Christian churches

Latinisation of liturgy refers to the process by which non-Latin Christian traditions, particularly those of Eastern Churches, adopted elements of the Latin Church's liturgical practices, theology, and customs. This phenomenon was often driven by ecclesiastical or political pressures and has left a lasting impact on global Christianity, sparking both unity and controversy. While it facilitated closer ties with the Catholic Church, it also led to the suppression of local liturgical traditions and significant debates over ecclesial identity.

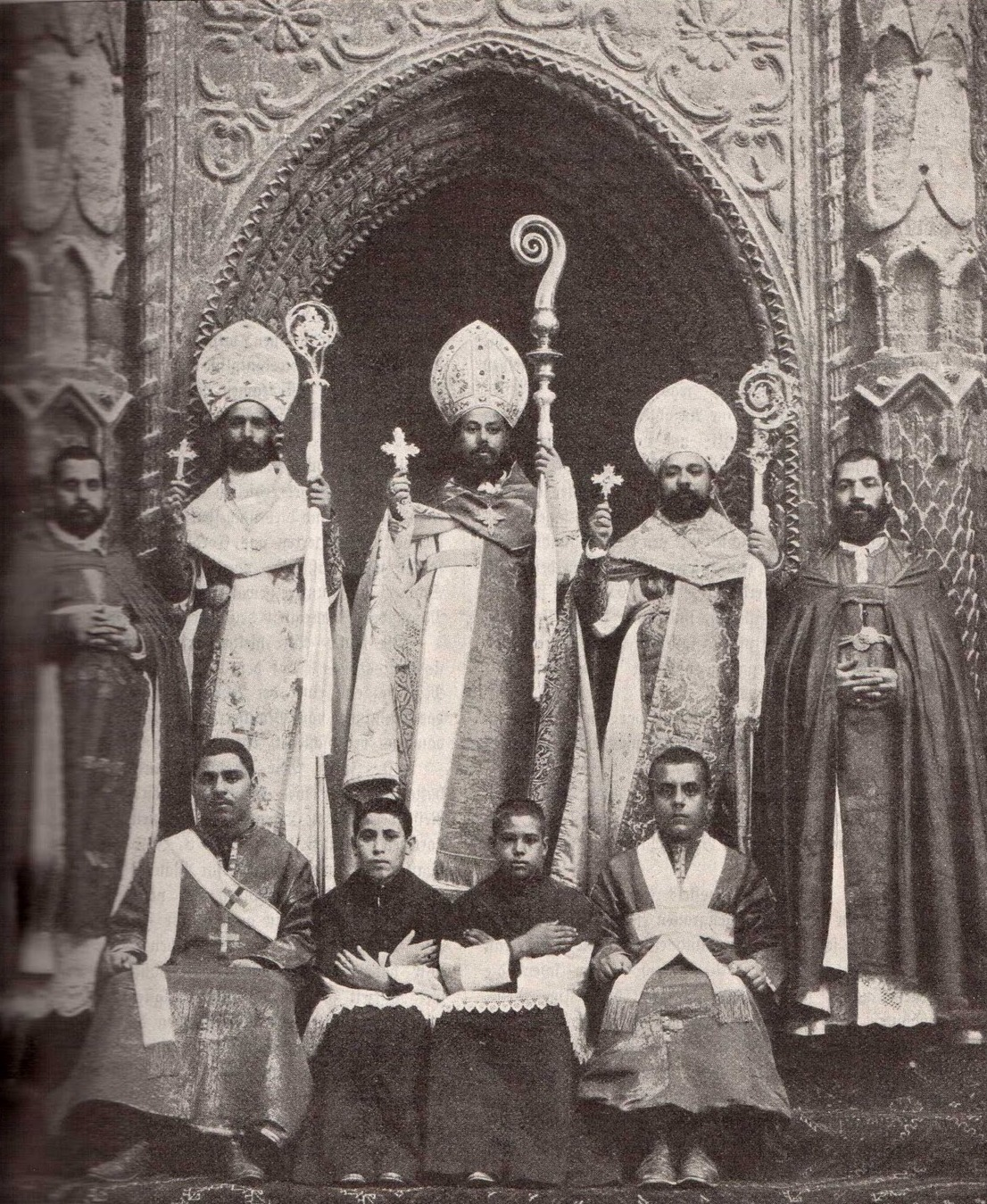
Coptic clergy and altar boys in Latin-style vestments

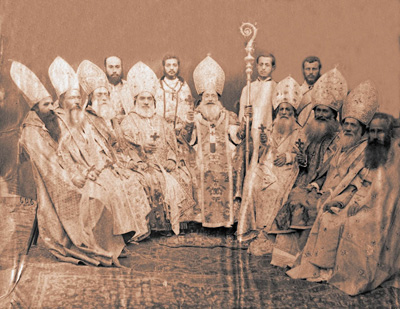
Armenian Apostolic patriarch wearing the roman Pallium.

== Background ==
The origins of Latinisation trace back to the early consolidation of the Latin Church's influence in Western Europe during the Early Middle Ages. As Christianity spread, the Roman Rite became synonymous with Catholic identity. Non-Latin Christian communities, such as the Goths and Celts, encountered pressures to align their liturgical practices with those of the dominant Latin Church.

During the Crusades (11th–13th centuries), encounters between Western and Eastern Christians introduced Latin customs to the Eastern liturgical sphere. Following the Union of Florence (1439) and the establishment of Eastern Catholic Churches in the wake of the Protestant Reformation, Latinisation intensified as Eastern Churches came into communion with Rome. These Churches were permitted to retain their liturgical traditions but were often compelled or encouraged to adopt Latin practices to emphasize their allegiance to the papacy.

== Notable examples ==
=== Synod of Diamper ===
The Portuguese colonial authorities and Jesuit missionaries convened the Synod of Diamper in 1599, to bring the Saint Thomas Christians of India into the Latin Padroado system. The synod prohibited East Syriac practices, replacing them with Latin customs, including changes in liturgical texts, vestments, and hierarchical structures. These actions eventually led to the Coonan Cross Oath in 1653, which split the community into factions.

In 1934, a liturgical reform begun under Pope Pius XI to restore the oriental character of the Malabar rite, with a restored Qurbana being introduced in 1962. Since then, the eucharistic liturgy has undergone further reform and Malayalam has supplanted Syriac as the liturgical language.

=== Maronite Church ===
The Maronite Church confirmed its unbroken communion with Rome in 1182 and from the thirteenth century onwards, progressive Latinisation begun. With increasing dependence on Rome during the Ottoman occupation of the Lebanon, this process was accentuated, with the high point being the provisions of the Lebanese Council of 1736. Western liturgical elements, such as the prohibition of infant communion and the introduction of Latin sacramentals, were integrated into its West Syriac liturgy. By the 19th century, the Maronite liturgy was considered highly Latinised, though a movement of liturgical renewals in the twentieth century has sought to reverse the process to a certain extent.

=== Ruthenian Uniate Church ===
The Synod of Zamość authorized the addition of Latin elements to the Byzantine Rite, including the insertion of the Filioque clause into the Nicene Creed and commemorations of the pope in the Ektenias. These changes aimed to solidify unity with Rome but were criticized by Orthodox counterparts and some Catholic theologians for diluting the Byzantine tradition.

After the Synod of Lviv in 1891, the Ruthenian Church in Galicia underwent further Latinisation. The Synod issued several decrees aligning liturgical practices more closely with those of the Latin Church. Among these were the mandatory adoption of the fixed liturgical color scheme, low (read) Divine Liturgy, the standardization of altar arrangement according to Latin norms (six candles on altar, a sanctuary lamp above the tabernacle etc.), and the encouragement for Eucharistic processions on major feast days.

=== Chaldean Catholic Church ===
The adaptation of the Anaphora of Addai and Mari to include an explicit consecration narrative is another example of Latinisation. The unmodified version of this East Syriac liturgy lacks the Words of Institution traditionally required for Eucharistic consecration in the Latin Church. This modification was criticized for altering an ancient rite but later approved for ecumenical use by the Vatican in 2001.

== Debates and controversies ==
Latinisation has been a source of significant theological and cultural debates. Critics argue that it marginalized local liturgical practices and created divisions within Christian communities. For example, the Coonan Cross Oath of 1653, a direct response to Latinisation, led to a schism among the Saint Thomas Christians, resulting in the formation of independent and Orthodox-aligned churches.

Controversy arose in the Ukrainian Greek Catholic Church, where reforms issued in 1941 introduced rubrics borrowed from Russian practice, replacing customs that were sometimes incorrectly perceived as Latinised. Critics argue that this disrupted long-standing local traditions and weakened their theological symbolism.

Theological concerns have also been raised about the imposition of Latin elements on Eastern liturgies. Many Eastern Christians viewed these practices as foreign and intrusive, disrupting the organic development of their traditions. Some Catholic theologians have criticized Latinisation for undermining the principles of inculturation and ecclesial diversity.

== Modern perspectives ==
The Second Vatican Council marked a turning point in addressing the legacy of Latinisation. The decree Orientalium Ecclesiarum emphasized the importance of preserving the authentic traditions of Eastern Catholic Churches. It called for a return to their ancient liturgical, theological, and spiritual practices while discouraging further adoption of Latin customs.

Efforts to reverse Latinisation have been uneven across Eastern Catholic Churches. For example, the Syro-Malabar Church has made strides in restoring its East Syriac heritage, though internal resistance persists. The Maronite Church has similarly undertaken reforms to recover its Syriac roots while retaining some Latin influences. In some parishes of the Ukrainian Greek Catholic Church, desire to keep Latinised practices caused schism in the Archeparchy of Lviv, clergy led by the excommunicated priest Vasyl Kovpak, founded the Society of Saint Josaphat to preserve these customs.

Bishop Nicholas Samra, Eparchial Bishop of Newton in the USA, argues that "excessive Latinization, theologically as well as liturgically" remains in place within the Melkite Greek Catholic Church.

== Cultural impact ==
Latinisation has had a profound impact on the cultural and artistic expressions of Christian communities. Western influences, such as Renaissance-style iconography, Baroque church architecture, and polyphonic choral music, became prominent in many Eastern Churches. These adaptations were often seen as a mark of Roman Catholic identity but have sparked debates about their appropriateness within Eastern liturgical contexts.

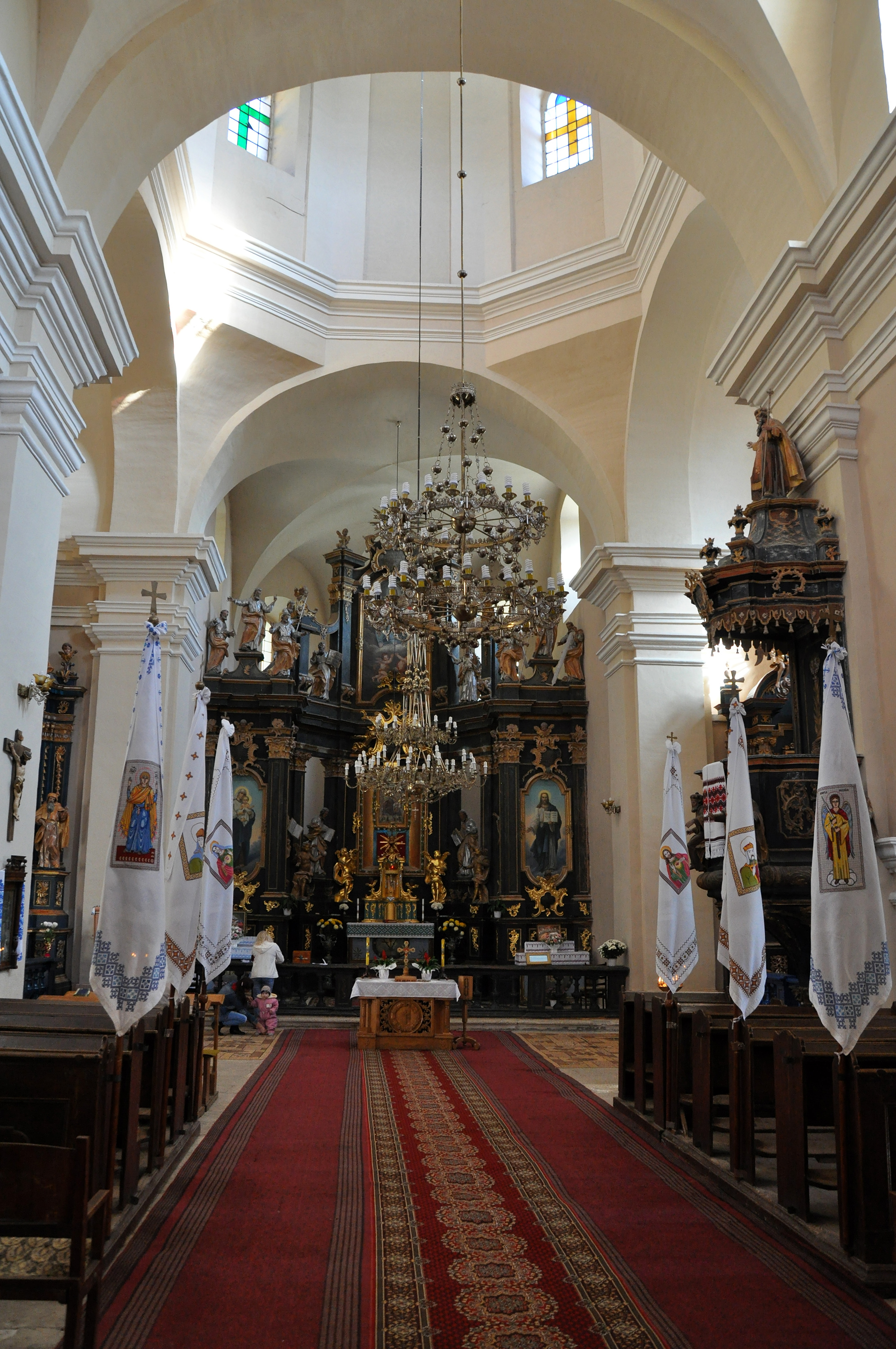
The heavily latinized interior of the Basilian Monastery of St. Onuphrius

The adoption of Western practices, such as pews and altar arrangements, has also been controversial. Some Eastern Orthodox and Oriental Orthodox communities that incorporated Latin-inspired elements later abandoned them in favor of their traditional practices, reflecting a broader trend of reclaiming authentic heritage.

== See also ==
- The Courage to Be Ourselves (1970), Eastern Catholic pastoral letter addressing Latinisation

== Sources ==
- Meyendorff, John (1989). Imperial unity and Christian divisions: The Church 450-680 A.D. Crestwood, NY: St. Vladimir's Seminary Press. ISBN 9780881410563.
- Parry, Ken; Melling, David J.; Brady, Dimitri; Griffith, Sidney H.; Healey, John F., eds. (1 September 2017) [1999]. The Blackwell Dictionary of Eastern Christianity. Oxford, UK: Blackwell Publishing Ltd. doi:10.1002/9781405166584. ISBN 978-1-4051-6658-4.
- Descy, Serge (1993). The Melkite Church. Boston: Sophia Press.
- Galadza, Peter (1994). "Liturgical Latinization and Kievan Ecumenism: Losing the Kaine of Koinonia" (PDF). Logos: A Journal of Eastern Christian Studies. 35 (1–4). Metropolitan Andrey Sheptytsky Institute of Eastern Christian Studies: 173–194.
