= Basil Kovpak =

Ukrainian excommunicated traditionalist Catholic priest (born 1967)

Reverend Father Basil Kovpak SSJK
- Native name: Василь Ковпак

Orders
- Ordination: 3 December 1989 by Sofron Dmyterko

Personal details
- Born: 11 December 1967 (age 58) Birky, Lviv Oblast, Ukraine
- Denomination: Catholicism

Basil Kovpak (Ukrainian: Василь Ковпак, Vasyl' Kovpak; born 11 December 1967) is a Ukrainian excommunicated traditionalist Catholic priest and the founder and current head of the Priestly Society of Saint Josaphat. Formerly a priest of the Archeparchy of Lviv of the Ukrainian Greek Catholic Church (UGCC), Kovpak was excommunicated by the UGCC in 2007.

== Early life ==
Kovpak was born on 11 December 1967. in Birky, Ukraine and grew up when the Ukrainian Greek Catholic Church was the world's largest illegal religious organization. According to Vlad Naumescu, Kovpak studied theology in a clandestine seminary run by Basilian monks. He headed the Basilian Third Order, which Naumescu has described as, "an uncompromisingly radical group of Greek Catholics, which did not accept any relation to Orthodoxy, 'reunited' priests, or the Soviet State."In December 1989, he was ordained to the priesthood by Sofron Dmyterko, Bishop-Ordinary of the Stanislaviv Eparchy. That same month, his parish was among the first in Lviv to return to the jurisdiction of the Ukrainian Greek Catholic Church.

Kovpak left the Basilian Order soon after his ordination in 1990, having observed that the community was, in his view, altering the tradition it had sought to preserve during the underground period and adapting to broader post-Soviet trends of church renewal, "having observed that the community was altering the tradition it had fought so hard to preserve during the underground era, now adapting to the general tendency of church renewal."

Fr. Kovpak was first assigned to St. Peter and Paul's Church in the Lviv suburb of Riasne in 1991. While stationed at Riasne, he began a, "move to reclaim the spirit the UGCC had under socialism." According to Naumescu, "Underground Greek-Catholics believed that suffering was a unique marker of faith under the old regime and that an appreciation of this suffering is indispensable to the proper understanding of the local tradition."

In Riasne, Fr. Kovpak, preached regularly of the importance of keeping, "the old traditions of the Greek Catholic Church and staying away from Orthodoxy." Fr. Kovpak also, "surrounded himself with a small group of priests and supporters who cherished the religious experience of the underground". Over time, Fr. Kovpak's assistant priests and parishioners either embraced his traditionalist agenda or, "switched to other parishes in the city." While at first many of Fr. Kovpak's supporters were elderly Greek Catholics who recalled, "how things were done before" the banning of the UGGC in 1946, over time, Fr. Kovpak's base supporters came increasingly from Greek Catholics who had participated in the Soviet era underground.

According to Vlad Naumescu, "These were entire families spanning several generations, and people who kept close contact with each other over their common involvement in illegal religious services, domestic devotions, and clandestine informal networks. For former participants in such surreptitious activities, memories of those times evoke a strong sense of nostalgia whenever they were recounted."

Beginning in the early 1990s, Fr. Kovpak began preparing multiple young men at his parish for the entrance exams to the newly opened UGCC seminary in the Lviv suburb of Rudno. At first, many of them successfully gained entry, but, by 1998–1999, potential seminarians from St. Peter and Paul's Church in Riasne ceased to be admitted, as they were considered to be Kovpakyvtsyi ("Kovpak's students").

== Priestly Society of Saint Josaphat ==
According to Vlad Naumescu, during the early 1990s, priests of the Society of Saint Pius X began visiting Western Ukraine and made contact with, "a group of Greek Catholic priests and lay members that favored religious practices derived from the Latin Rite (an important component of their underground practices) and helped them organize into an active society."

In 1999, Fr. Kovpak and two other UGCC priests asked SSPX Superior General Bishop Bernard Fellay to become their spiritual leader. The reasons for this move were that the three priests hoped to obtain both approval and support from fellow Traditionalist Catholics in the West. In September 2000, Bishop Fellay agreed and the Priestly Society of St. Josaphat was founded.

The Priestly Society of Saint Josaphat extends the SSPX's criticism of indifferentism and Modernism in the Catholic Church to the Ukrainian Greek Catholic Church. They oppose certain decisions of the Second Vatican Council and aspects of ecumenism and interreligious dialogue practised by the Ukrainian Greek Catholic Hierarchy and the Holy See.

In addition to opposing the banning of Latin Rite practices and devotions, the Society rejects the drastically shortened Divine Liturgy introduced from the Ukrainian diaspora and the replacement of the traditional Church Slavonic liturgical language with the vernacular Ukrainian language. As an alternative, Fr. Kovpak and his fellow Greek Catholic traditionalists say what they consider the Pravdyvyi ("True") Rite, which often lasts two and a half to three hours.

According to Vlad Naumescu, "Religious life in a traditionalist parish followed the model of the 'underground church.' Devotions were more intense, with each priest promoting his parish as a 'place of pilgrimage' for the neighboring areas, thus drawing larger crowds on Sunday than his local parish could provide. On Sundays and feast days, religious services took place three times a day (in Riasne), and the Sunday liturgy lasted for two and a half to three hours. The main religious celebrations took place outside the church in the middle of the neighborhood, and on every occasion traditionalists organized long processions through the entire locality. The community was strongly united by its common opponent, re-enacting the model of the 'defender of faith' common to times of repression. This model, which presupposes clear-cut attitudes and a firm moral stance, mobilized the community and reproduced the former determination of the 'underground' believers."

== Dispute with Ukrainian Greek Catholic Church authorities ==
In the February 2003 issue of Patriayarkhat, the official journal of the Ukrainian Greek-Catholic Church, an article appeared, written by a student of the Ukrainian Catholic University, which, since its founding, has been the strongest Modernist voice within the Church. The article named priests and parishes in every eparchy in Ukraine who described themselves as "traditionalists" and who formed a well organized movement which the student called both a continuation of the underground church and a serious danger to the UGCC. According to the article, Traditionalists constituted "a parallel structure" with Vasyl Kovpak as their undisputed and charismatic leader and had connections with the Society of St. Pius X.

In response to an investigation of him ordered by Cardinal Husar in September 2003, Fr. Kovpak wrote and published the book, Persecuted Tradition. In it, he accused the UGCC bishops with subjecting traditional Greek Catholic priests to severe mental and emotional abuse. He also pointed out cases in which Ukrainian laity were refused Holy Communion because they insisting on kneeling for it.

Fr. Kovpak also accused the hierarchy of the UGCC of embracing an extreme form of Ukrainian nationalism and cites many examples of the UGCC turning away Orthodox clergy and laity who wish to convert to Eastern Catholicism. In these cases, he alleges, this is because the would be converts are ethnic Russians. Fr. Kovpak called this a betrayal of the efforts by Pope Pius X, Metropolitan Andrey Sheptytsky, and Exarch Leonid Feodorov to create the Russian Greek Catholic Church and to convert the Russian people to Eastern Catholicism.

He also accused the UGCC leaders of indifferentism, of tolerating and encouraging liturgical abuses such as "monks with guitars", and of having publicly posed for photographs and conducted interreligious prayer meetings with Buddhists and Hare Krishnas. Fr. Kovpak further cited virulently Anti-Catholic remarks by the very Orthodox prelates with whom Cardinal Lubomyr Husar, Archeparch of Lviv and Major Archbishop of the Ukrainian Greek Catholic Church, was pursuing ecumenism and "seeking a false unity". As an alternative, Kovpak argues in favor of the doctrine Extra Ecclesiam nulla salus.

The SSPX is preparing an English translation of the book, the original of which is in Ukrainian.

On 10 February 2004, Cardinal Husar announced that Fr. Kovpak, through his links to the SSPX, had brought upon himself excommunication by "recognis(ing) the uncanonical foreign Bishop Bernard Fellay, who does not recognise the authority of the Pope of Rome and is not united with the Catholic Church." Husar also announced his decision to replace Fr. Kovpak as pastor of St. Peter and Paul's Church and suspend his status as a Greek Catholic priest.

On February 15, 2004, the first Sunday following the decree, two priests where dispatched to Riasne from St. George's Cathedral, "to replace Kovpak in his function as parish priest". When they arrived, however, the two priests found that the parishioners had gathered in front of the church. The parishioners angrily denounced the two priests, allegedly threatened them, and turned them both away with instructions never to return.

The following Sunday, however, the two priests returned accompanied by Fr. Orest Fredina, the Chancellor of the Archeparchy of Lviv. Fr. Orest pleaded with the parishioners to accept the two priests instead of Fr. Kovpak. As Fr. Orest spoke, however, the parishioners became angry and shouted, "The parish already has its own priest!" At last, the three priests departed. The incident received wide attention from the Ukrainian media.

At the time, Vlad Naumescu was accompanying a Greek Catholic religious pilgrimage from Lviv to the alleged apparition site at the village of Lishnia. Most of Naumescu's fellow pilgrims were serious, rather than passive, Greek Catholic believers who had been involved in the underground and who were regular visitors to "alternative" devotional sites similar to Fr. Kovpak's parish in Riasne. Following the Divine Liturgy in Lishnia, the pilgrims began, "an animated discussion of the Kovpak case". While the pilgrim's sympathized with Fr. Kovpak's plight and his struggle for, "our tradition", they debated whether or not the priest was, "on the right track", and expressed concern over whether the authority of Pope John Paul II had been defied through Fr. Kovpak's ties to the SSPX. Fr. Kovpak's "alleged insubordination to the Greek Catholic Hierarchy", however, was far less of a concern to the pilgrims.

Kovpak denied that he recognized Bishop Fellay as his own canonical bishop, and declared his intention to appeal to the Holy See. The Sacra Rota Romana accepted his appeal and declared Fr. Kovpak's excommunication null and void for lack of canonical form.

== Excommunication ==
On 22 November 2006, Bishop Richard Williamson who was then a member of the Society of St. Pius X (SSPX), ordained two priests and seven deacons in Warsaw, Poland, for the SSJK, in violation of canon 1015 §2, and of canons 1021 and 1331 §2 of the Code of Canon Law, and the corresponding canons of the Code of Canons of the Eastern Churches.

Fr. John Jenkins, an SSPX priest who was present, later remarked, "We were all very edified by their piety, and I myself was astonished by the resemblance of the atmosphere amongst the seminarians with that which I knew in the seminary – this in spite of the difference of language, nationality and even rite."

Fr. Jenkins also said that Kyr Ihor Vozniak, the new Archeparch of Lviv, had declared that his main task for the following year would be to eradicate the "Lefebvrists" from his territory.

Meanwhile, Kyr Ihor denounced Bishop Williamson's ordinations as a "criminal act" and condemned Kovpak's participation in the ceremony. He stressed that the two priests that Williamson had ordained would not receive faculties within his Archeparchy. Officials of the Lviv archdiocese said that Kovpak could face excommunication, and that "'he deceives the church by declaring that he is a Greek (Byzantine) Catholic priest,' while supporting a group [SSPX] that uses the old Latin liturgy exclusively, eschewing the Byzantine tradition, and does not maintain allegiance to the Holy See."

Accordingly, Kovpak's excommunication process was restarted by the hierarchy of the Ukrainian Greek-Catholic Church and confirmed by the Congregation for the Doctrine of the Faith on 23 November 2007.

While the excommunication of the four bishops whom Archbishop Marcel Lefebvre consecrated in spite of the prohibition of Canon 1013 was, at their request, lifted by Pope Benedict XVI in January 2009, Fr. Kovpak has not sought to have his own excommunication lifted by the Ukrainian Greek Catholic Church or by the Holy See.

== Current status ==
The Society of St. Josaphat has possession of the Ukrainian Greek Catholic parish church in the village of Ivano-Frankove (Yaniv), which is seen as their national headquarters. Those who do not identify as "Traditionalists" continue to attend the Divine Liturgy in the local Latin Rite parish.

While Ukrainian traditionalists have often been accused of having links to the SSPX solely for financial reasons, they would not, according to Vlad Naumescu, have been able to survive as a movement without the money donated to them by Roman Rite Traditionalists in the West.

The Society operates a seminary in Lviv, where the seminarians are taught by Fr. Kovpak and by SPPX priests visiting from Poland. The Society also consists of a group of Greek Catholic nuns, who were forced to leave the Basilian Order in 1995, "because of their 'traditionalist' ideas" and who now reside in the house where Blessed Nicholas Charnetsky died following his release from the Gulag. The room in which Kyr Nicholas died is now the convent's chapel.

Since 2001, the SSJK has published a bimonthly magazine titled, Dzvin z Fatimy ("Bells from Fatima"). In addition to Persecuted Tradition, the PSSJK's publishing house has also released a book of traditional Ukrainian Christmas songs and a book about the 1917 apparitions of Our Lady of Fatima.

Unlike the Ukrainian orthodox Greek Catholic Church, Fr. Kovpak and the PSSJK reject both Sedevacantism and Conclavism.

== Quote ==
- "Being traditionalist means knowing and protecting the traditional knowledge of the Church."
