= St. Josaphat Ukrainian Catholic Cathedral (Parma, Ohio) =

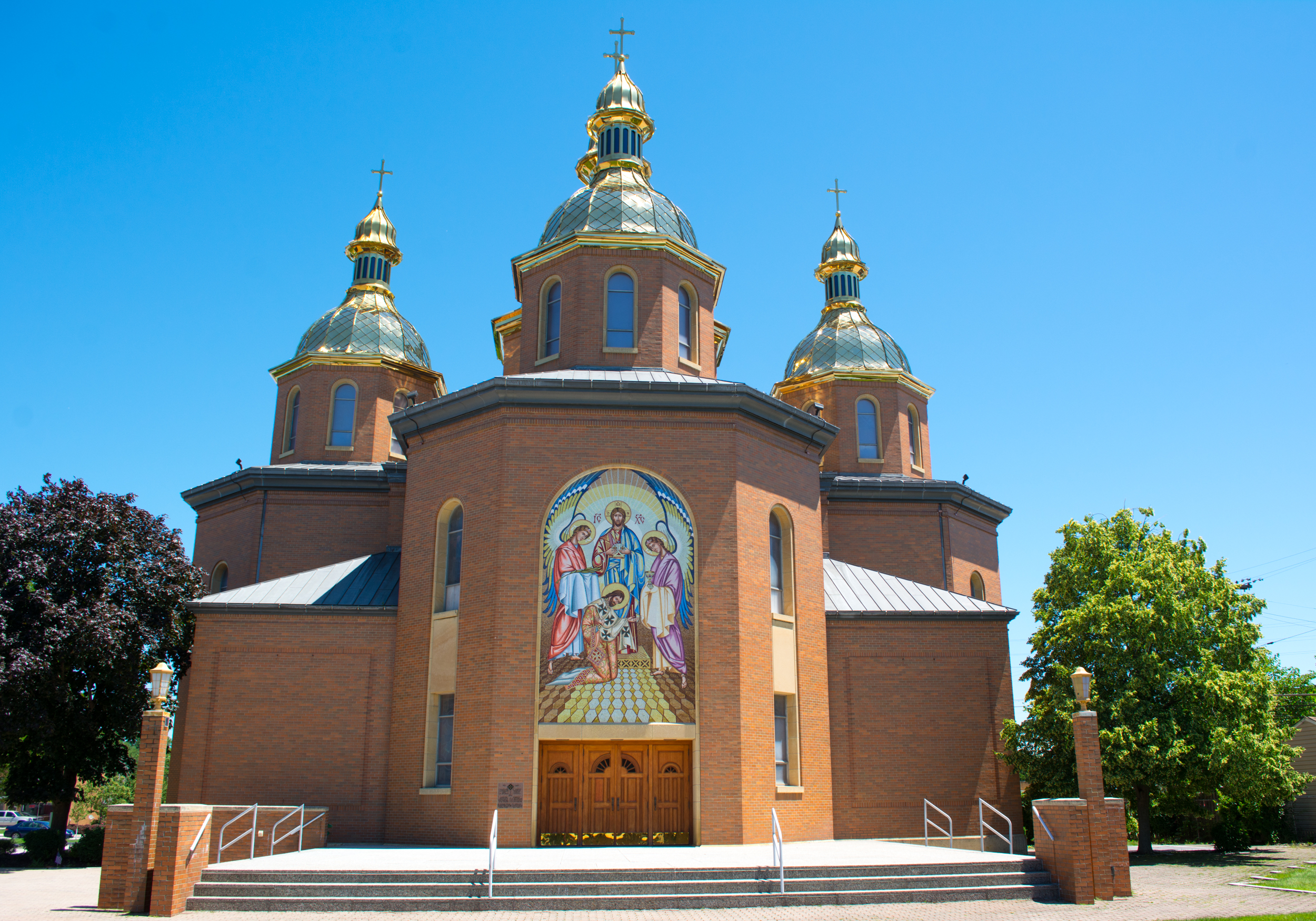
- St. Josaphat Ukrainian Catholic Cathedral in Parma, Ohio, U.S.
- St. Josaphat Ukrainian Catholic Cathedral
- 41°24′24″N 81°42′40″W
- Location: 5720 State Road; Parma, Ohio
- Country: United States
- Denomination: Ukrainian Greek Catholic Church
- Website: stjosaphatcathedral.com

Architecture
- Architect: McWilliams-Martyniuk-Schidlowski
- Style: Byzantine Revival
- Groundbreaking: June 24, 1982

Specifications
- Capacity: 500

Administration
- Diocese: Saint Josaphat in Parma

Clergy
- Bishop: Bohdan Danylo

St. Josaphat Ukrainian Catholic Cathedral is a Ukrainian Catholic cathedral located in Parma, Ohio, in the United States. The cathedral grew out of a parochial school which opened in 1951 and a parish erected in 1959. Construction on the cathedral began in 1982, and was completed in 1985. It was dedicated in 1988, the thousand-year anniversary of the arrival of Christianity in Ukraine. The cathedral is the seat for the Ukrainian Catholic Eparchy of Saint Josaphat in Parma, which was erected in 1983 during construction of the building.

== Site: School and chapel ==
=== School growth ===
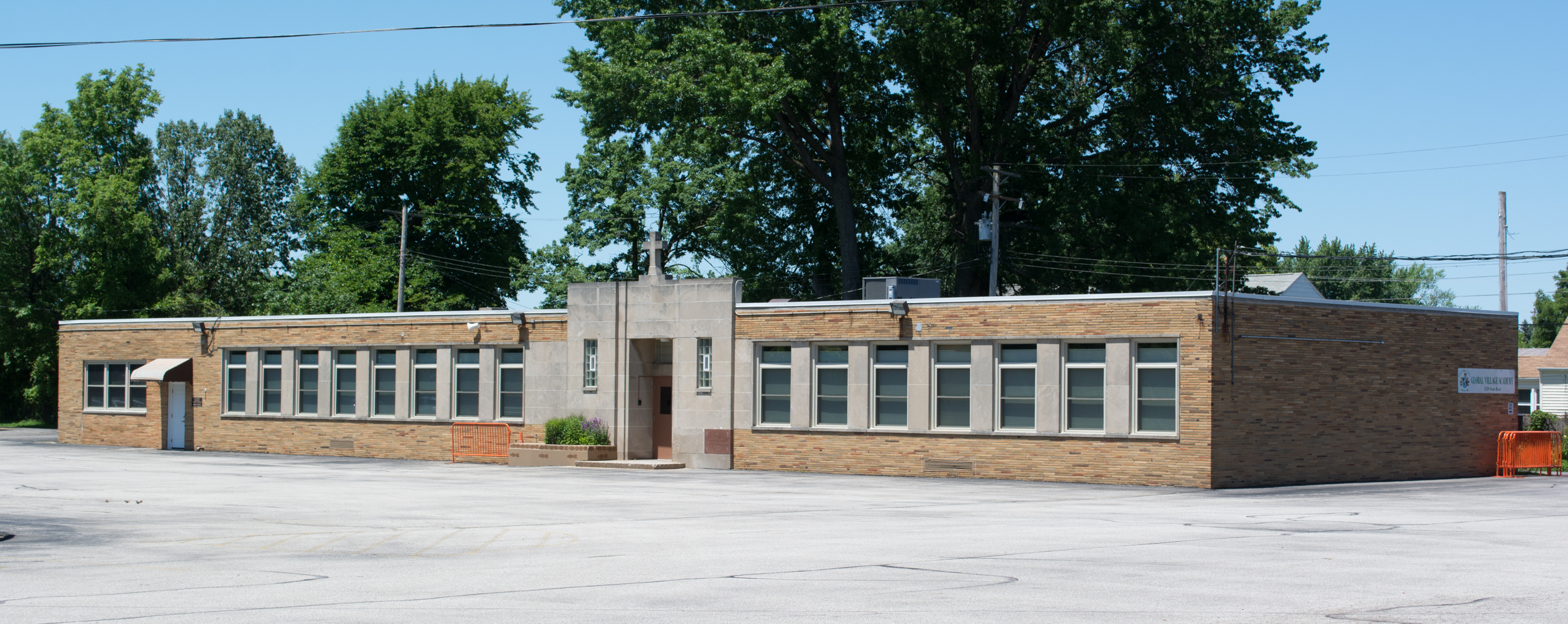
1953 school building

In 1947, Saints Peter and Paul Ukrainian Catholic Church in Cleveland, Ohio, purchased 10 acres (4.0 ha) of land (Note: A later source says 10.5 acres (4.2 ha).) in then-sparsely populated Parma, Ohio. The $32,000 ($400,000 in 2025 dollars) school was dedicated on May 31, 1951, and opened the following November 15. The school was staffed by the Sisters of the Order of St. Basil the Great. The school contained a chapel, named for St. Josaphat. which served as a mission church to Ukrainian Catholic families in the area. The chapel was renovated in 1959, at which time the name of the school was changed to St. Josaphat School.

A second, $100,000 ($1,200,000 in 2025 dollars) school building on the site was completed in 1953 and blessed on May 9, 1954. A convent building for the Sisters of St. Basil was blessed on the site on May 9, 1954, as well.

A five-classroom addition to the St. Josaphat School was built in 1965.

=== Construction of the "Astrodome" ===
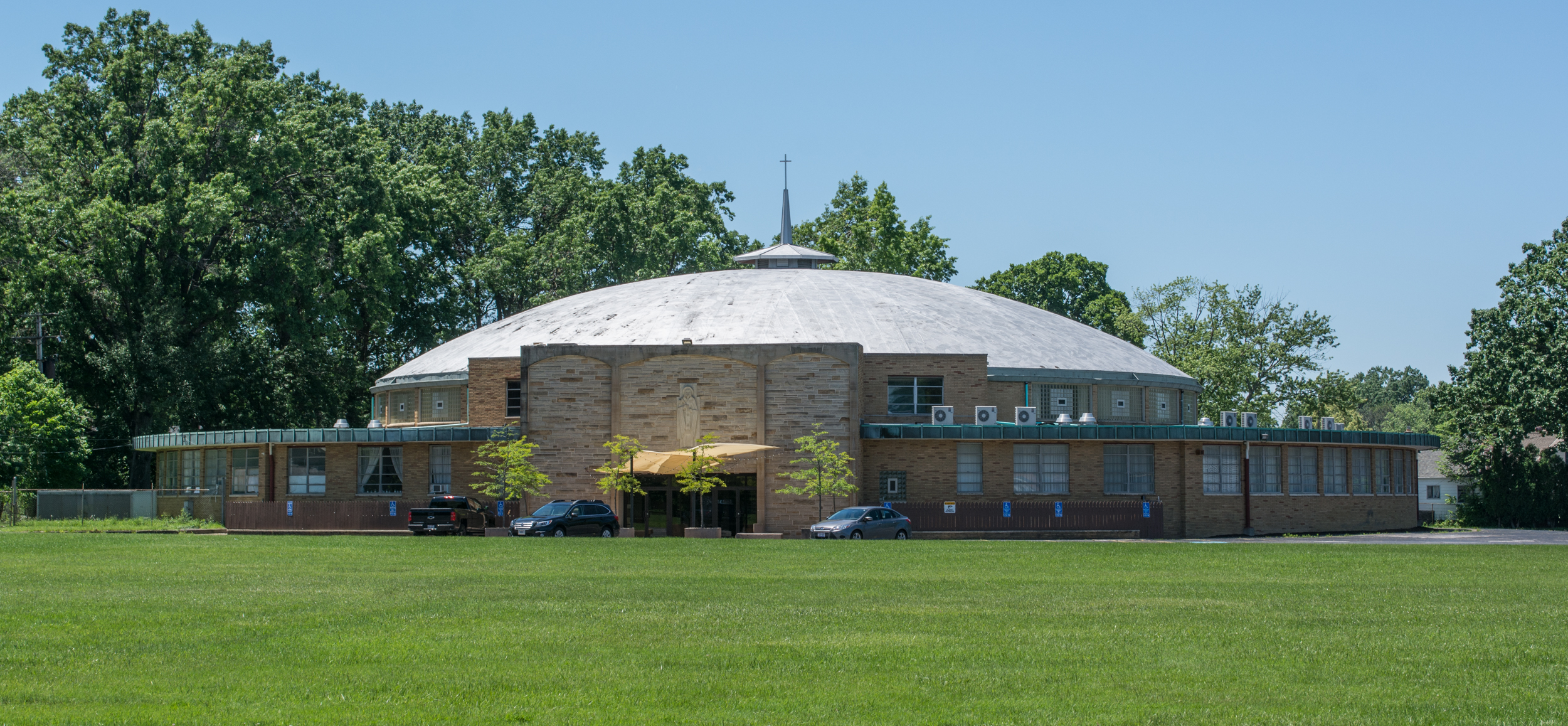
"Astrodome"

In the summer of 1961, St. Josaphat Parish began construction of a high school on its property. Parishioner Nicholas Baiko, an engineer with the Arthur G. McKee & Co. industrial engineering firm, did the preliminary drawings. Parishioner Michael Stefanyk, an architect and engineer, completed the plans. The dome of the school was designed by Roof Structures, Inc. of St. Louis, Missouri, while the architectural firm of T.A. Badowski & Associates consulted.

Designed for 500 students, the structure was circular and features 16 one-story classrooms clustered around a central dome. The classroom ring contained administrative offices, classrooms, a library, and laboratories. The central dome was a combination auditorium, gymnasium, and theatre. The wall supporting the dome was 25 feet (7.6 m) high, and the dome rose another 48 feet (15 m) above the wall. The dome itself was 140 feet (43 m) in diameter, while the classroom ring was 211 feet (64 m) in diameter.

The foundation consisted of reinforced concrete footers standing on bedrock. The structure had an extensive basement. Initially designed to act as a fallout shelter capable of serving 2,000 people, it was redesigned so that half the space was occupied by Heating, ventilation, and air conditioning machinery while the other half contained seven classrooms and a cafeteria. (Note: The number of below-ground classrooms is derived from a June 1964 newspaper article which reported that the building had 22 classrooms in total. Another news media article just three months later noted that there were 15 ground-level classrooms. This indicates seven classrooms were below-ground.) The outer wall of the classroom ring was built of brick with stone trim, while the higher inner wall was concrete block and glass brick. A hallway around the inner wall gave students access to all classrooms and the dome. Roughly halfway up the inner wall, a balcony projected into the dome. A ring of poured reinforced concrete lay atop the balcony, anchoring it to this wall. Another ring of poured reinforced concrete lay atop the wall. The base of the dome itself was made of steel plate. Each plate was 9 inches (230 mm) high and 1.5 inches (38 mm) thick, and they were both bolted and welded where they joined one another. The dome was supported by wooden ribs, each 4 by 10 inches (100 by 250 mm) in size. Manufactured in Oregon, they were curved on the top to match the arc of the dome. Thirty-two ribs were jointed with steel angle plates to the dome rim. Halfway to the dome apex, the 32 ribs were spliced into one another (again using steel angle plates) to create 16 ribs. These 16 ribs were bolted to a steel ring at the apex of the dome. Secondary wooden beams were used between the ribs to enhance the dome's stability. Tongue and groove planks, each 2 inches (51 mm) thick, were spiked to the ribs from the outside. These in turn were covered with 1 inch (25 mm) thick composite insulation board. Liquid hot asphalt was mopped onto the insulation board, building up the roof. A layer of white marble chips was impregnated into the asphalt to complete the roof. The auditorium and balcony could accommodate 1,500 people. The structure was estimated to cost $1 million ($10.8 million in 2025 dollars), with another $700,000 ($7.54 million in 2025 dollars) in labor donated free from parishioners.

When construction began in May 1961, parish officials believed the high school would be complete in September 1962. Construction delays were numerous, however, and by June 1964 officials thought that five classrooms might open in September 1965. The building was finally completed in early 1969, and blessed by Archbishop Ambrose Senyshyn of the Archeparchy of Philadelphia on April 20, 1969.

For various reasons, the school never opened. It was repurposed into an event center, public auditorium, public theatre, and sports venue. It was first known as St. Josaphat Auditorium, but by 1975 had been nicknamed the "St. Josaphat Astrodome" for its resemblance to the Houston Astrodome.

=== Congregation and chapel ===
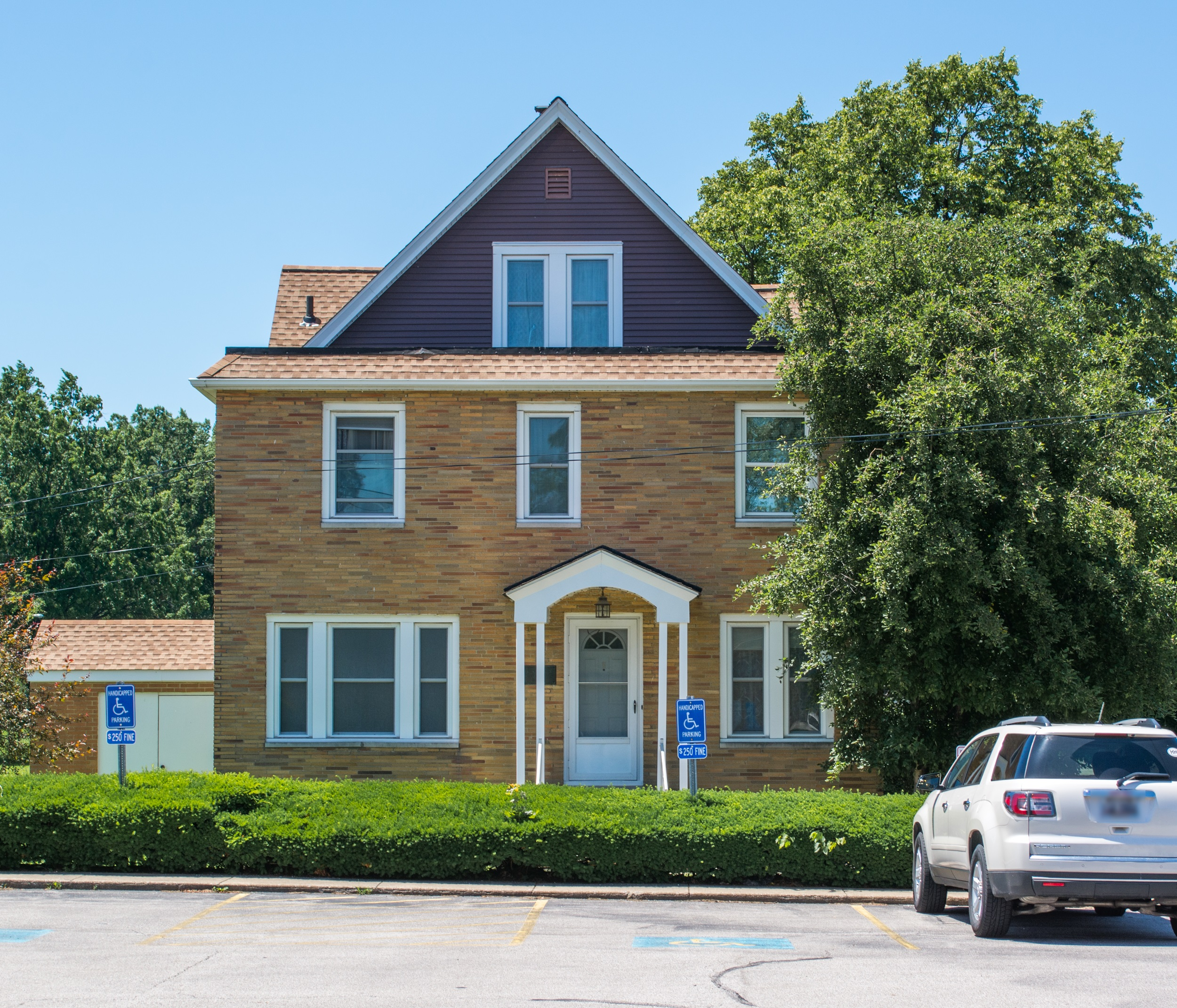
Rectory

Archbishop Constantine Bohachevsky erected St. Josaphat Parish in August 1959, appointing Rev. Andrew Ulicky (an assistant pastor at SS. Peter and Paul Church) as the pastor. Brookpark Road was named the dividing line between the mother parish and the new St. Josaphat, whose boundary extended south to Medina, Ohio. The erection of the new parish came about due to the significant growth among Ukrainian Catholics in the area (now numbering some 450 families).

St. Josaphat Chapel was redecorated after the elevation to parish status. Artist Theodore Katomay of Chicago created 24 murals for the renovation, 17 of which were placed in the sanctuary. The new murals were in place in time for the Christmas celebration on January 7, 1961, and blessed on January 22 by Monsignor Dmytro Gresko of SS. Peter and Paul and Rev. Ulicky.

A fire broke out in St. Josaphat Chapel during the evening mass on April 11, 1973. It began in the sacristy, and 40 worshippers fled the blaze. The fire did $100,000 ($700,000 in 2025 dollars) in damage, destroying the sacristy and main altar and scorching some pews.

== Cathedral ==
=== Construction ===
Rev. Ulicky originally sought to build a church immediately after erection of the parish. Church leaders, however, believed construction of the high school should come first. In 1973, Father Ulicky was appointed pastor at St. Mary Byzantine Catholic Church in Johnstown, Pennsylvania. His successor, the Very Reverend Yaroslaw Sirko, continued to plan for construction of a church, but died in October 1979 after a two-year battle with cancer. The Right Reverend Michael Fedorowich, assigned to St. Josaphat in December 1979, began the process of organizing committees to plan the new church.

The structure was designed by the firm of McWilliams Martyniuk Schidlowski of Kent, Ohio, and built under the auspices of general contractor Chopko Construction. The 500-seat building incorporated traditional features such as onion domes on the roof and an altar set in the east wall. It also included contemporary and "futuristic" architectural details in order to reflect the then-upcoming thousand-year anniversary of Christianity's introduction in Ukraine.

Ground for the cathedral was broken on June 24, 1982. The initial cost was estimated at $2.3 million ($7.67 million in 2025 dollars). Topping out of the church occurred on August 30, 1983, when the 12 short tons (11 t) main aluminum onion dome was set atop the church. During construction, the Eparchy of Saint Josaphat was erected in December 1983. Robert Mikhail Moskal was installed as the first eparch (bishop) of the diocese at the unfinished cathedral on February 29, 1984. A ceremonial cornerstone was laid and blessed on November 11, 1984, which happened to be the 25th anniversary of the congregation's establishment as well.

St. Josaphat Ukrainian Catholic Cathedral held its first services on June 24, 1985. Eparch Robert Moskal led a procession from the chapel to the cathedral carrying the Blessed Sacrament and relics of St. Josaphat, then celebrated a pontifical divine liturgy at the new church. The cathedral was blessed once.

The consecration of St. Josaphat Cathedral was delayed until May 1, 1988, the year in which Ukrainians observed the thousand-year anniversary of Christianity in Ukraine. This also allowed for completion of all iconostasis and other interior decorations. Cardinal Myroslav Ivan Lubachivsky, head of the Ukrainian Greek Catholic Church worldwide, led the April 29 rites consecrating the main altar, assisted by Archbishop Maxim Hermaniuk of the Archeparchy of Winnipeg, Archbishop Stephen Sulyk of the Archeparchy of Philadelphia, Exarch Michel Hrynchyshyn of the Apostolic Exarchate of France, Benelux and Switzerland, Eparch Andrew Pataki of the Ruthenian Catholic Eparchy of Parma, and others.

Consecration of the walls occurred on May 1. A procession led by Cardinal Lubachivsky, Archbishop and Papal Pro-Nuncio Pio Laghi, Bishop Anthony Pilla of the Roman Catholic Diocese of Cleveland, Bishop James William Malone of the Roman Catholic Diocese of Youngstown, and Bishop Emeritus William Michael Cosgrove of the Roman Catholic Diocese of Belleville circled the building before entering. Cardinal Lubachivsky anointed the wall behind the main altar with holy chrism, Archbishop Laghi the north wall, and Archbishops Hermaniuk and Sulyk the south and west walls. The walls were sprinkled with holy water, concluding the consecration rite. A Pontifical High Mass followed.

=== Cathedral history ===
The cathedral is the seat of the Ukrainian Catholic Eparchy of Saint Josaphat.

St. Josaphat's aluminum domes gradually faded to a celadon color due to weathering. They were painted gold in the 1990s.

A shrine to Our Lady of Pochaiv was dedicated on the cathedral grounds on May 23, 2010. The shrine was the result of a seven-year design and fundraising effort by the St. Josaphat Apostleship of Prayer, a group of women congregants. The shrine was designed by a Cleveland firm, Kulchytsky Architects. The brick shrine holds a mosaic in the likeness of the painted Ukrainian icon, which was designed by Eikona Studios of Cleveland and created in Italy. The shrine was blessed by Bishop John Bura, then apostolic administrator of the Eparchy of St. Josaphat.

The domes atop the cathedral were replaced in 2015. Parishioners of St. Josaphat began raising funds about 2010 to replace the cathedral's five domes, which had deteriorated over time. Architect Christ J. Kamages was hired to design the replacements, and Unique Services & Applications installed them. The new domes are made of stainless steel and covered with titanium nitride, a ceramic material with a brilliant gold sheen. Construction of the domes began in the spring of 2015, and were blessed by Eparch Bohdan Danylo on October 5. Installation was completed in November. The $550,000 ($700,000 in 2025 dollars) domes are expected to last from 50 to 200 years.

== See also ==
- List of Catholic cathedrals in the United States
- List of cathedrals in the United States
