= Josaphat Kuntsevych =

Ukrainian Greek Catholic archbishop and martyr

Saint Josaphat Kuntsevych O.S.B.M.
- Archeparch of Polotsk
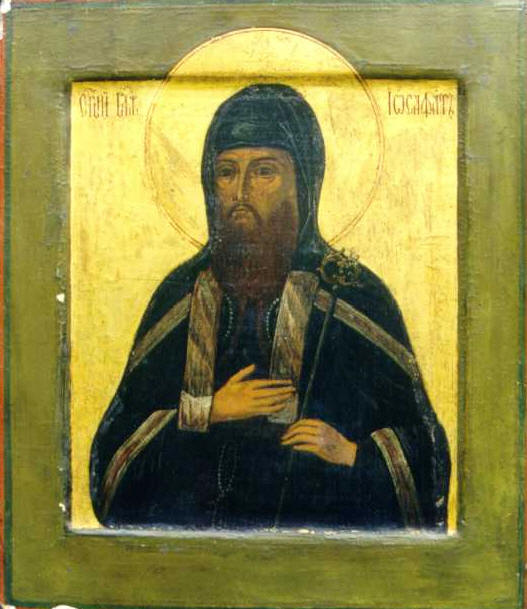
- Icon of St. Josaphat
- Church: Ruthenian Uniate Church (present-day Ukrainian Greek Catholic Church)
- Diocese: Archeparchy of Polotsk
- Appointed: 1618
- Term ended: November 12, 1623
- Predecessor: Gedeon Brolnitskyj
- Successor: Antonius Sielava

Orders
- Ordination: 1609
- Consecration: 12 November 1617 by Archeparch Gedeon Brolnitskyj

Personal details
- Born: Ivan Kunchych c. 1580 Volodymyr, Volhynian Voivodeship, Polish–Lithuanian Commonwealth
- Died: November 12, 1623 Vitebsk, Vitebsk Voivodeship, Polish–Lithuanian Commonwealth
- Coat of arms: Josaphat Kuntsevych's coat of arms

Sainthood
- Feast day: November 12 (Latin Church, Ukrainian Greek Catholic Church, Belarusian Greek Catholic Church, Romanian Greek Catholic Church, Ruthenian Catholic Church); November 14 (General Roman Calendar of 1960)
- Title as Saint: Bishop and martyr
- Beatified: May 16, 1643; Rome by Pope Urban VIII
- Canonized: June 29, 1867; Rome by Pope Pius IX
- Patronage: [Ukraine]The St Leonards academy

Ordination history of Josaphat Kuntsevych
History
Priestly ordination
- Date: 1609
Episcopal consecration
- Date: November 12, 1617

Family shield

Coat of Arms

Josaphat Kuntsevych, OSBM (born Ivan or John; c. 1580 – 12 November 1623) was a Basilian prelate of the Ruthenian Greek Catholic Church who served as Archbishop of Polotsk from 1618 to 1623. On 12 November 1623, he was beaten to death with an axe during an anti-Catholic riot by Eastern Orthodox Belarusians in Vitebsk, (Note: Vitebsk was an important town built at a portage between the Daugava River and Dnieper River along the trade route from the Varangians to the Greeks. It was granted Magdeburg rights in 1597. Those Magdeburg rights were divested from Vitebsk in 1624 as a punishment for Kuntsevych's murder.) in the eastern peripheries of the Polish–Lithuanian Commonwealth.

His death reflects the conflict between the Eastern Orthodox Church and the Eastern Catholic Churches that intensified after four Ruthenian Orthodox Church (Kiev Metropolitanate) bishops transferred their allegiance from the Ecumenical Patriarchate in Constantinople to the Holy See, under the terms laid down by the 1439 Council of Florence, by signing the 1596 Union of Brest. Josaphat remains one of the best-known victims of anti-Catholic violence for his role in both personally accepting and very effectively spreading the Eastern Catholic Churches as a hieromonk and bishop. He was canonized in 1867 by Pope Pius IX as a saint and is revered as a martyr in the Catholic Church. (Note: "Polemical assessments still dominate the church literature" about Kuntsevych. According to the Religious Information Service of Ukraine at Ukrainian Catholic University, "the circumstances of his life and his murder have been heavily researched and are devoid of religious myths" but "known only by a narrow circle of scholars.")

In response to the nickname "The Soul-Snatcher", which Josaphat received from both his Orthodox and Calvinist opponents, his biographer, Fr. Demetrius Wysochansky, has written:

In summing up his pastoral activities which were directed towards the one goal of snatching souls, his contemporaries and witnesses to his life were able to say: 'Whatever Catholics there are in Polotsk, are the fruit of the pastoral labors of Josaphat.' To this statement one may add that whatever Catholics there have been in Lithuania and Byelorussia in the 350 years since Josaphat's death, may all attribute their Catholic Faith to the labors and blood of Josaphat, the 'Soul-Snatcher'.

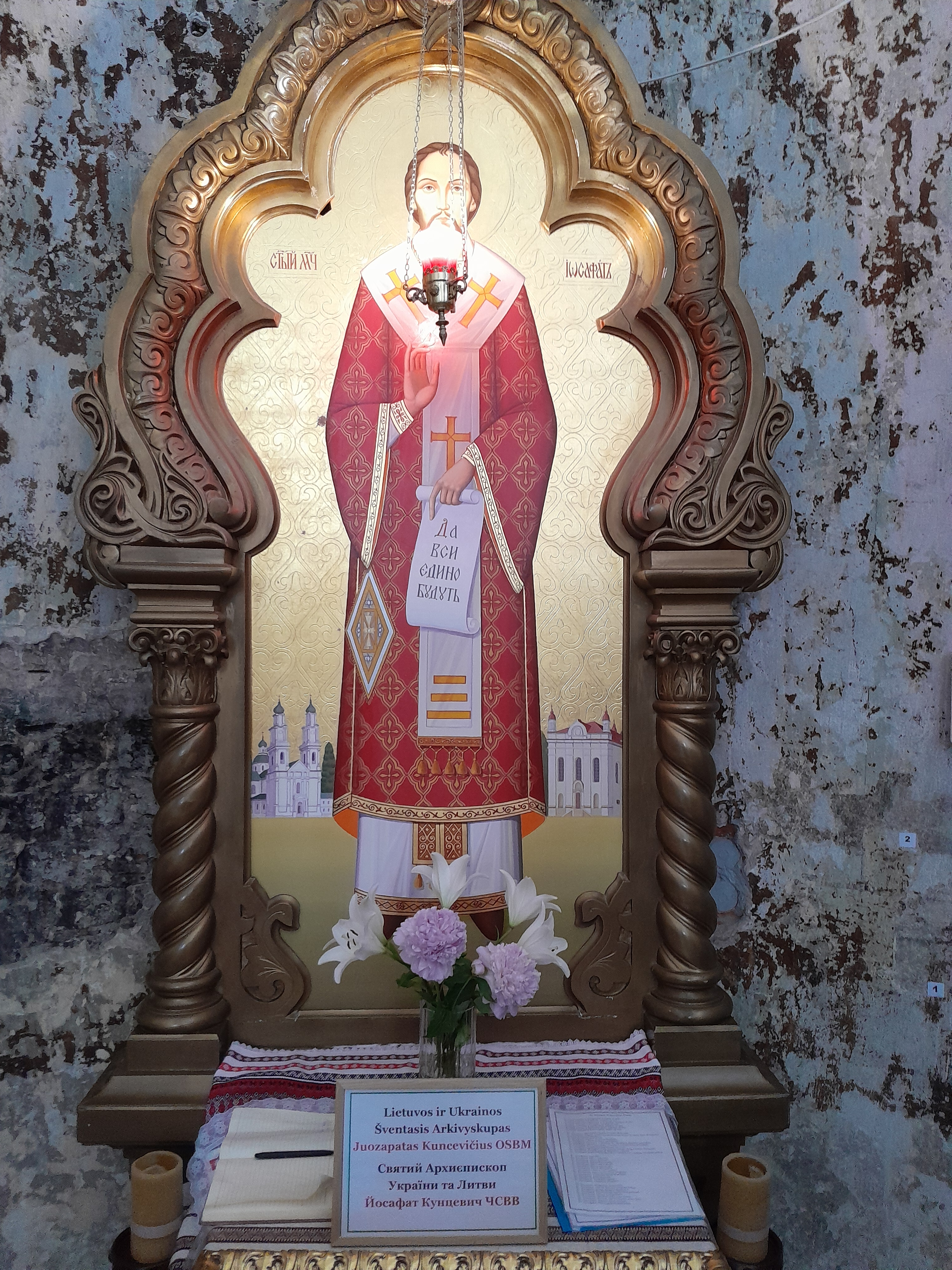
Saint Josaphat, depicted in a Ukrainian Greek Catholic monastery in Vilnius.

== Life and career ==
=== Historical and religious background ===
King Sigismund III Vasa's policy for the Counter-Reformation in the Polish–Lithuanian Commonwealth was to reunite, "through missions to non-Catholics, both Protestant and Orthodox," all Christians into the Catholic Church. After preliminary negotiations with Sigismund III and with Grand Chancellor and Great Hetman of the Crown Jan Zamoyski, a delegation of bishops from the Eastern Orthodox Metropolitanate of Kiev (1458–1596) was sent to Rome in 1595 to accede to the Union of Brest on condition that their rituals and discipline were left intact. Most Eastern Orthodox bishops within the Commonwealth, including Michael Rohoza, metropolitan of Kiev – but at Vilnius, (Note: Vilnius was granted Magdeburg rights in 1387.) Vilnius Voivodeship, the capital city of the Grand Duchy of Lithuania, in the Polish–Lithuanian Commonwealth – were signatories of the Union of Brest in 1596 which brought the Metropolitanate of Kiev into communion with the pope. Two ecclesiastical factions, those Eastern Orthodox bishops who were signatories and those Eastern Orthodox bishops who were not signatories, met and excommunicated each other, but those who did not assent were in a much worse position than before, because they were no longer officially recognized. The Union resulted in two sectarian groups:

- Ruthenian Orthodox Christians who accepted the Union of Brest became Eastern Catholics and were known as "Uniates", (Note: "Greek Catholic Confession of the Slavonic Rite".) "(Polish: unici)", a term which, while once widely used and considered benign, is now considered derogatory and insulting. Eastern Catholic Ruthenians were detested, and considered "schismatics and traitors" by those who remained Orthodox and under the Ecumenical Patriarchate. (Note: The conflict between the two sectarian groups "has lasted into the 21st century.") "About two-thirds of the Ruthenian population", however, had become Greek-Catholics by 1620. The northeastern voivodeships became predominantly "Uniate".
- Eastern Orthodox adherents who did not assent to the Union of Brest articles remained Eastern Orthodox and were known as "Disuniates", or "(Polish: dysunici)"; they were also called "dissidents" by both Roman and Byzantine Catholics. (Note: "Greek Orthodox Confession of the Slavonic Rite".) The southeastern voivodeships became predominantly Disuniate. Disuniates were subjected to varying degrees of religious discrimination by the Government of the Commonwealth, at the insistence of some Byzantine and Roman Catholic clergy. The Disuniates were leaderless until a reestablished Eastern Orthodox Metropolitanate of Kiev was consecrated in 1620, which the government legalized in 1632.

=== Early life ===
He was born John (or Ivan) Kuntsevych in 1580 or 1584 in Volodymyr, (Note: Volodymyr was granted Magdeburg rights in 1431.) Volhynian Voivodeship, in the Lesser Poland Province of the Polish Crown (now in Ukraine). He was baptized into a family associated with the Eastern Orthodox Church.

Although descended from Ruthenian nobility (szlachta, Kuncewicz family), his father had embarked in business, and held the office of town-councilor. Both of Kuntsevych's parents encouraged religious participation and Christian piety in the young John. In the school at Volodymyr he gave evidence of unusual talent; he studied Church Slavonic and memorized most of the Horologion, which from this period he began to read daily. From this source he drew his early religious education. (Note: The "flagrant and manifold abuses" in the Eastern Orthodox Church within the Commonwealth, seemed according to Bain, "to justify the necessity of its union with the better-ordered and instructed Roman Church. All contemporary evidence describes its condition in the darkest colours. The bishops, with scarce an exception, were robbers and ruffians; the lesser clergy followed the unedifying example of their ecclesiastical superiors. Konstanty Ostrogski, voivode of Kiev, the chief pillar of the Orthodox church, bitterly complained that the common people hungered in vain for the word of God," and Smotrytsky "declared that he could not lay his hand on three Orthodox preachers, and that, but for the aid of Catholic postils, there would have been no preaching at all." An attempt by Jeremias II of Constantinople, in 1588, "to reform these abuses only made matters worse and raised a storm of protest.")

Owing to his parents' poverty, Kuntsevych was apprenticed to a merchant named Papovič in Vilnius. In Vilnius, divided through the contentions of the various religious sects, he became acquainted with men such as Josyf Veliamyn Rutsky, a former Calvinist who converted to Catholicism and transferred from the Western to the Byzantine Rite. Rutsky supported the recent union with Rome, and under his influence Kuntsevych grew interested in the Catholic Church.

=== Monk ===
In 1604, in his early 20s, Kuntsevych entered the Monastery of the Trinity (Church and monastery of Holy Trinity) of the Order of Saint Basil the Great in Vilnius, at which time he was given the religious name of Josaphat. Seeking to emulate the Desert Fathers of Roman Egypt, Brother Josaphat repeated the Jesus Prayer so constantly that he was heard to still murmur it during his sleep. He also engaged in many acts of mortification of the flesh, such as praying overnight in the parish cemetery during the winter, while barefoot and deliberately underdressed, in order to offer up his suffering towards the salvation of souls. According the Beatification testimony of his fellow monks, Brother Josaphat regularly prayed while disciplining himself, "Lord, God, grant unity to the Holy Church and the conversion of the Dissidents."

Stories that the young monk was a Greek Catholic Starets spread rapidly and many distinguished people began to visit the Monastery to speak with him for Spiritual direction. Many other young men joined the Monastery, which only recently had been on the verge of closure, due to Brother Josaphat's reputation for holiness. Brother Josaphat believed, based on his own studies of history, the liturgical books, and many other sources, that the Union of Brest represented a return to the true roots and origins of the Christian East. He was so successful at arguing in favor of this point and persuading both Orthodox Christians and Ruthenian and Lithuanian Calvinists to convert to Eastern Catholicism, that his theological opponents dubbed him, "The soul-snatcher".

During his beatification process, Dorotheus Akhrymovych, a Polotsk city councilman who had known Josaphat in Vilna, testified, "Though the parents of the young boys complained publicly and privately about him, calling him the 'Soul-snatcher' of their sons, later, after their sons returned home from their studies, they were happy with the results and thanked the holy man."

Father Gennadius Khmelnytsky later testified, "Because of the numerous souls he was converting to God and the numerous boys he was drawing into the religious life from among the townspeople and the nobility, the Dissidents called him 'Soul-snatcher', instead of his own name Josaphat. They painted a picture of the Last Judgement which they placed in the vestibule of the Orthodox church, in which Josaphat was depicted as one of the devils who was dragging souls to Hell with a hook. Below the painting were written the words: 'Soul-snatcher.'"

Whenever Brother Josaphat, however, was called this name, however, he would chuckle and respond, "God grant me the grace to snatch all your souls and lead them to Heaven."

After a notable life as a layman, Rutsky also joined the Order in 1607.

=== Priest and Archbishop ===
When Josaphat was ordained to the diaconate, his regular services and labor for the Church had already begun. As a result of his efforts, the number of novices to the Order steadily increased, and under Rutsky – who had meanwhile been ordained a priest – a revival of Eastern Catholic monastic life began among the Ruthenians (Belarusians and Ukrainians). In 1609, after private study under Jesuit Valentin Groza Fabricy, Josaphat was ordained a priest by a Greek Catholic bishop.

Joseph Velamin-Rutski later testified, "He took care of the condemned prisoners to their very last hour, as if there were no one else to do it. After hearing their confessions, he would accompany them to the place of execution, without showing a shadow of reluctance on his face, even if the time were most inopportune, in the evening, for example, or in wintertime. He went gladly as if it were a feast day."

He subsequently became the hegumen (prior) of several monasteries.

During his Beatification process, Raphael Korsak testified, "Josaphat never neglected to give alms to the poor, to widows, and especially to orphans. Everyone loved him. Whenever he left the Church, everyone pressed towards the Church doors, seeking solace in his words. Hence, when he was elevated from the office of Hegumen to Archbishop of Polotsk, the beggars wept as they bade their protector farewell. His mercy was even more evident when he became Archbishop, so that one could say that his palace was like a market place and trading post for beggars."

On November 12, 1617, he was consecrated as the coadjutor archeparch for the Archeparchy of Polotsk. (Note: Polotsk was an important town built at a junction of key trade routes from northern Europe to Constantinople. It was granted Magdeburg rights in 1498.) He succeeded as archeparch in March 1618. During his episcopacy, the Saint Sophia Cathedral in Polotsk was rebuilt in 1618–1620.

Kuntsevych faced the daunting task of bringing the local populace to accept union with Rome. He faced stiff opposition from the monks, who feared liturgical Latinisation of the Byzantine Rite as well as from widowed priests who had remarried in open violation of the Eastern Code of Canons. As archeparch he: restored the churches: issued a catechism to the clergy, with instructions that it should be memorized; composed rules for priestly life, and entrusted deacons the task of superintending their observance; assembled synods in various towns in the dioceses; and firmly opposed the Grand Chancellor of the Grand Duchy of Lithuania, Lew Sapieha, who wished to make what Josaphat saw as too many concessions to the Eastern Orthodox at the expense of Greek Catholic faithful. Throughout all his strivings and all his occupations, he continued his religious devotion as a monk, and never abated his practice of mortification of the flesh in order to offer up his sufferings for the conversion of others. Through all this he was successful in winning over a large portion of the people.

Discontent increased among the inhabitants of the eastern voivodeships. In 1618 an Orthodox nobleman at Mohilev, (Note: Mohilev was granted Magdeburg rights by Stephen Báthory in 1577.) Vitebsk Voivodeship, who had apparently assented to the Union of Brest, openly resisted its implementation and replaced Greek Catholic priests with Disuniate priests. They substituted the names of Timothy II, patriarch of Constantinople, and Osman II, Sultan of the Ottoman Empire, in the Divine Liturgy for those of Pope Paul V and Sigismund III. (Note: Walerian Krasiński believed this demonstrated "what a strong feeling must have existed" against the Tsardom of Russia: when oppressed on account of their religion, they turned to the distant Islamic Ottoman Empire rather than the nearby Eastern Orthodox Tsardom of Russia.) The resistance at Mohilev led to a government crackdown against local Orthodox, and a 1619 judicial decree condemned the leaders of the insurrection to death, confiscated all the previously Eastern Orthodox church buildings at Mohilev, and gave them instead to the Ruthenian Catholic Archeparchy of Polotsk. (Note: Bohdan Sobol, the father of Spiridon Sobol, was among those executed.)

Norman Davies alleged in God's Playground that Josaphat Kuntsevych "was no man of peace, and had been involved in all manner of oppressions, including that most offensive of petty persecutions – the refusal to allow the Orthodox peasants to bury their dead in consecrated ground;" in other words, he is alleged to have prohibited burial of "Dissidents" in Greek Catholic cemeteries.

The Ruthenian Orthodox did not disappear, however. In 1620 they assembled in synod at Kiev, protected by Petro Konashevych-Sahaidachny, hetman of Zaporizhian Cossacks, and elected new Eastern Orthodox bishops including Meletius Smotrytsky as archbishop-elect of Polotsk, all of whom were consecrated "in great secrecy" at Kiev by Theophanes III, the visiting Greek Orthodox Patriarch of Jerusalem, Neophyte, metropolitan of Sofia, and Avramios, bishop of Stagoi. Thus a rival Orthodox hierarchy was established. In response, King Sigismund III accused Patriarch Theophanes III, with some justification, of being a covert agent working to destabilize the Polish-Lithuanian Commonwealth on behalf of the Ottoman Empire and ordered his arrest and arrest of all Bishops consecrated by him.

That changed in 1620, when, with Cossack aid, a rival Eastern Orthodox hierarchy was set up by the Orthodox Church, with Smotrytsky (who later himself entered into communion with the see of Rome) being appointed the Orthodox Archeparch of Polotsk. Smotrytsky publicly claimed that Kuntsevych was preparing a total Latinization of the Church and its rituals.

After 1620, according to Orest Subtelny, in Ukraine, sectarian violence over ownership of church property increased and "hundreds of clerics on both sides died in confrontations that often took the form of pitched battles."

The government imposed a settlement on the "unsettling and destructive" conflict in 1632 by legalizing the Disuniate hierarchy and redistributing church property between Uniates and Disuniates. (Note: Bain noted that, c. 1632, the nobles and clergy owned most of the land in the Kingdom; the clergy owned 160,000 villages out of a total of 215,000, and paid no taxes at all.)

=== Death ===
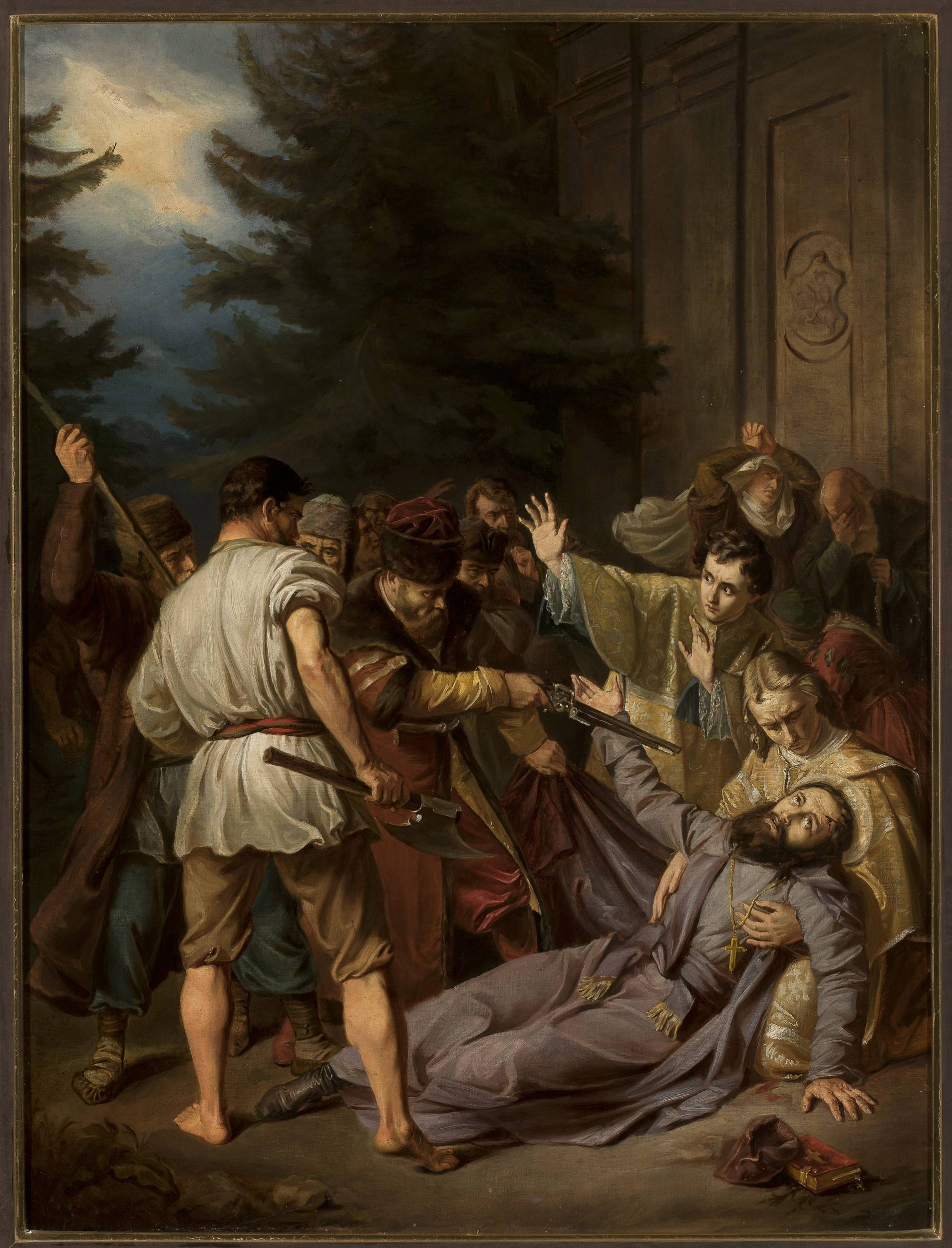
Martyrdom of Josaphat Kuntsevych (c. 1861) by Józef Simmler, National Museum in Warsaw

In October 1623 Kuntsevych ordered the arrest of the last priest who was clandestinely holding Orthodox services at Vitebsk, where Kuntsevych had a residence. Enraged at this, some Orthodox townspeople lynched Kuntsevych on 12 November. Witnesses of the event described it as follows:

The ringing of cathedral bells and the bells of other churches spread. This was the signal and call to insurrection. From all sides of town masses of people – men, women, and children – gathered with stones and attacked the archbishop's residence. The masses attacked and injured the servants and assistants of the archbishop, and broke into the room where he was alone. One hit him on the head with a stick, another split it with an axe, and when Kuntsevych fell, they started beating him. They looted his house, dragged his body to the plaza, cursed him – even women and children. ...They dragged him naked through the streets of the city all the way to the hill overlooking the river Dvina. Finally, after tying stones to the dead body, they threw him into the Dvina at its deepest.

John Szlupas wrote, in The Princeton Theological Review, that the Lithuanian Protestants were also the secret instigators in the murder of Kuntsevych, and Smotrytsky, the chief agent in the murder, was in constant communication with them.

In January 1624, a commission presided over by Sapieha investigated Kuntsevych's murder and sentenced 93 people to death for their involvement in the conspiracy, (Note: According to Kempa, 74 of the 93 people sentenced to death were sentenced in absentia.) and many were banished and their property confiscated. The townhall and the disuniate churches were destroyed, and the franchises of the city abolished, but restored under the subsequent reign. With Kuntsevych's death the Disuniates were completely broken up in Lithuania, and their leaders were severely punished. The Disuniates lost their churches in Vitebsk, Polotsk, Orsha, Mogilev, and other places. Smotrytsky joined the Uniates in order to escape punishment, and turned his pen against the Disuniates whose weaknesses were not secrets from him. The body was recovered from the river and lay in state in the cathedral of Polatsk. Beatification followed in 1643, but canonization did not take place until 1867, more than two centuries later. The body is now in Saint Peter's Basilica in Rome, placed under the altar of Saint Basil the Great.

=== Hagiography ===
As a boy Kuntsevych was said to have shunned the usual games of childhood, prayed much, and lost no opportunity to assist at the Church services. Children especially regarded him with affection. As an apprentice, he devoted every leisure hour to prayer and study. At first Papovič viewed this behavior with displeasure, but Josaphat gradually won such a position in his esteem that Papovič offered him his entire fortune and his daughter's hand. But Josaphat's love for the religious life never wavered.

Kuntsevych's favourite devotional exercise was the traditional Eastern monastic practice of prostrations, in which the head touches the ground, while saying the Jesus Prayer. Never eating meat, he fasted much, wore a hair shirt and a chain around his waist. He slept on the bare floor, and chastised his body until the blood flowed. The Jesuits frequently urged him to set some bounds to his austerities.

From Kuntsevych's zealous study of the Church Slavonic Byzantine Rite liturgical books he drew many proofs of Catholic doctrine and wrote several original works. Throughout his adult life, he was distinguished by his extraordinary zeal in performing the Church services and by extraordinary devotion during the Divine Liturgy. Not only in the church did he preach and hear confessions, but likewise in the fields, hospitals, prisons, and even on his personal journeys. This zeal, united with his kindness for the poor, led great numbers of Eastern Orthodox confession Ruthenians to a religious conversion to the Eastern Catholic confession and Catholic unity. Among his converts were many important personages such as deposed Patriarch Ignatius, of Moscow, and Manuel Kantakouzenos, who belonged to the imperial family of the Byzantine Emperor Palaeologus.

=== Canonization ===
Saint Josaphat O.S.B.M.
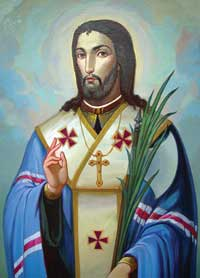

Archeparch of Polotsk, Hieromartyr
- Born: Josaphat Kuntsevych; Ivan Kunchych; c. 1580; Volodymyr, Volhynian Voivodeship, Polish–Lithuanian Commonwealth
- Died: November 12, 1623; Vitebsk, Vitebsk Voivodeship, Polish–Lithuanian Commonwealth
- Venerated in: Catholic Church
- Feast: November 12 (Latin Church, Ukrainian Greek Catholic Church, Belarusian Greek Catholic Church, Romanian Greek Catholic Church, Ruthenian Catholic Church); November 14 (General Roman Calendar of 1960)
- Patronage: Ukraine

After numerous miracles attributed to Kuntsevych were reported to Church officials, Pope Urban VIII appointed a commission, in 1628, to inquire into his possible canonization, which examined 116 witnesses under oath. Josaphat's body was claimed to be incorrupt five years after his death. In 1637, a second commission investigated his life and, in 1643, Josaphat was beatified. He was canonized on June 29, 1867, by Pope Pius IX.

The Ukrainian Greek Catholic Church celebrates his feast day on November 12. When, in 1867, Pius IX inserted his feast into the General Roman Calendar, it was assigned to November 14, which was the first free day after November 12, which was then occupied by the feast of "Saint Martin I, Pope and Martyr." In the General Roman Calendar of 1969, this latter feast was moved to Pope Saint Martin's dies natalis ('birthday to heaven'), and Saint Josaphat's feast was moved to that date, his own dies natalis. Some Traditionalist Catholics continue to observe the General Roman Calendar of 1954, the General Roman Calendar of Pope Pius XII, or the General Roman Calendar of 1960, in which the feast day is on November 14.

Kuntsevych's canonization process began in the interval of the January Uprising of 1863–1865 against the Russian Empire and was "understood in many circles, including Polish, Russian, and Ruthenian circles, as a papal gesture of moral support for the insurgent Poles." A Russophile Ruthenian newspaper, Slovo, published several negative articles about Kuntsevych. (Note: For example, portions of a 1622 letter from Sapieha to Kuntsevych were published by Slovo. According to Himka, "Slovo was insinuating by publishing this letter that" Kuntsevych was not a martyr but was murdered "as a natural consequence of his own violent actions." The canonization was used to "shape and reinforce" the emotional character about "a key Russophile argument" – that an Eastern Catholic Church was not beneficial to Ruthenians. Krasiński included only an English translation of an extraction from the Sapieha letter. While Alphonse Guépin included a French translation of the entire Sapieha letter and the entire Kuntsevych response to Sapieha. Neither letter was included in an abridged Polish translation of Guépin by Walerian Kalinka.) This antagonism to his canonization "makes sense within the context of the Russophile hegemony in Ruthenian public opinion" and was seen as an insult to Imperial Russia. The Russian government responded, in 1875, with further Russification and forced conversion of the Eastern Catholic Chełm Eparchy, the last Eastern Catholic eparchy in the Russian Empire.

=== Veneration ===
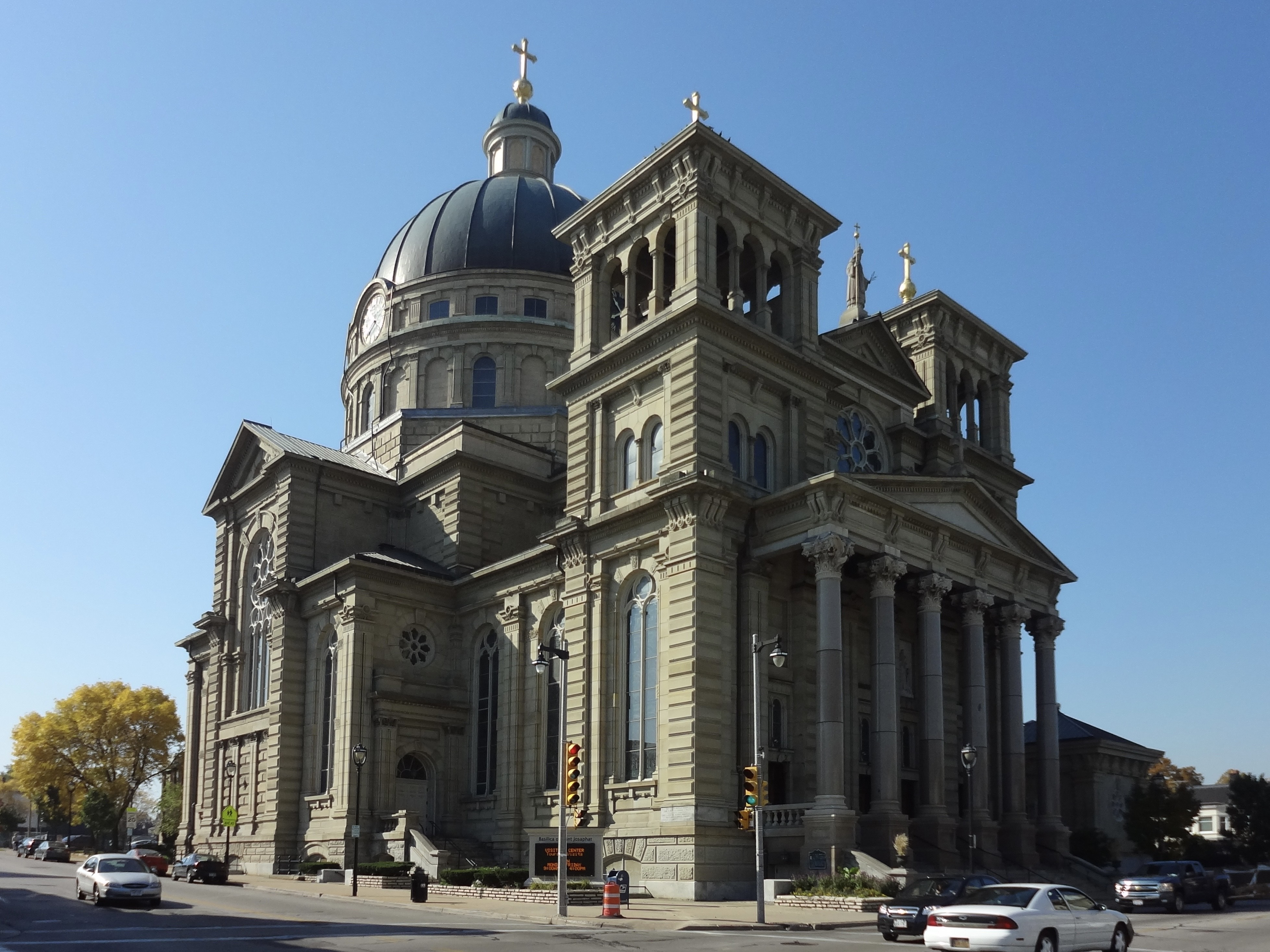
The Basilica of St. Josaphat in Milwaukee

According to The Oxford Dictionary of Saints, Kuntsevych could be thought of as a patron "of ecumenical endeavour today."

==== Churches ====
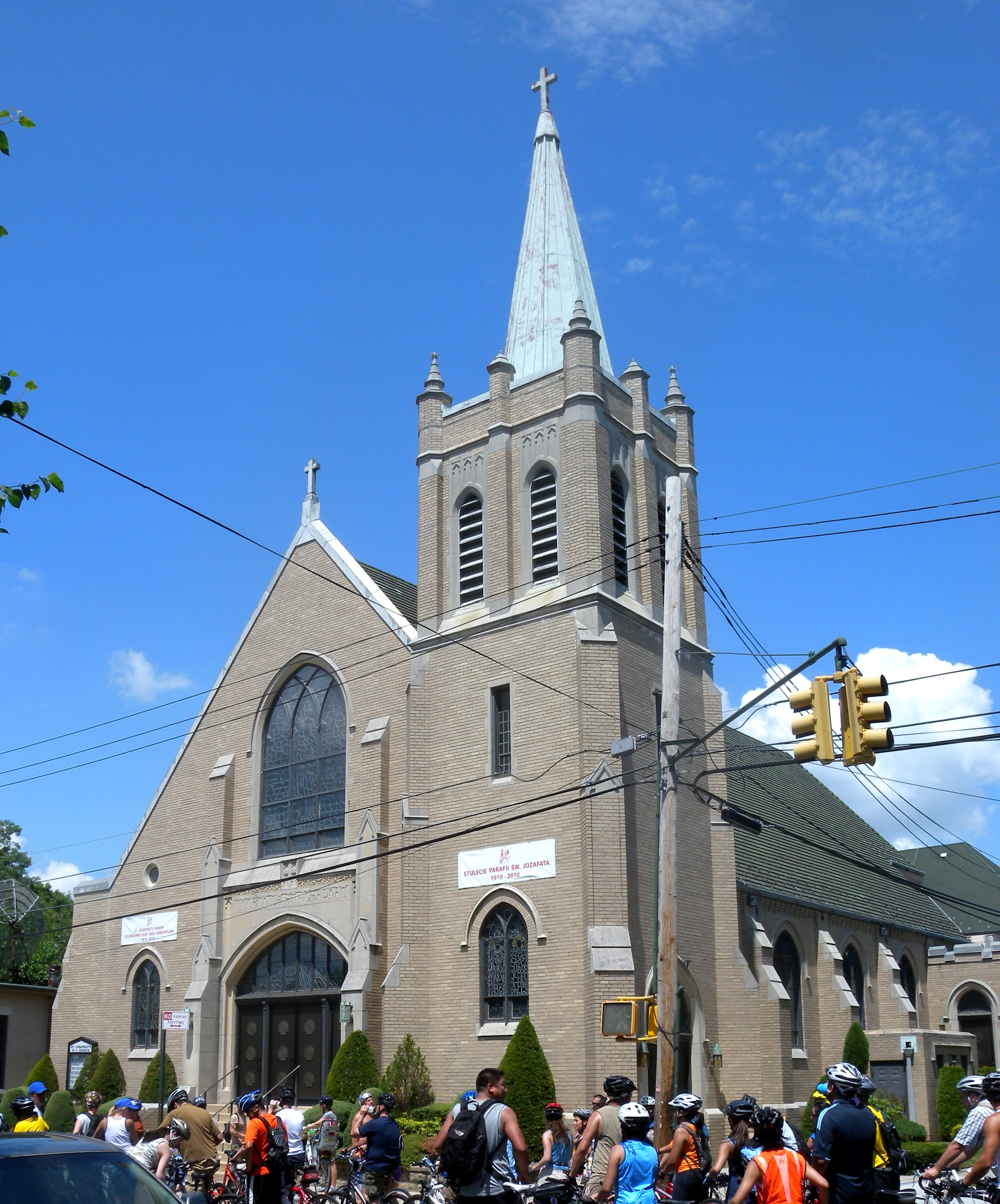
St Josephat Oratory in New York City

St. Josaphat Kuntsevych is the patron saint of a number of Polish and Ukrainian churches and parishes in the United States and Canada, including:

- Basilica of St. Josaphat, in Milwaukee, Wisconsin
- St. Josaphat Ukrainian Catholic Cathedral of the Ukrainian Catholic Eparchy of Saint Josaphat in Parma, Ohio.
- St. Josaphat Roman Catholic Church in Chicago, Illinois
- St. Josaphat Oratory of Bayside, Queens, New York, operating under the Institute of Christ the King Sovereign Priest.
- St. Josaphat's Ukrainian Catholic Church in Rochester, NY
- St. Josaphat's Roman Catholic Church in Detroit
- St. Josaphat Parish in Cheektowaga, New York, in the Roman Catholic Diocese of Buffalo
- St. Josaphat's Cathedral and Ukrainian elementary school in Toronto
- St. Josaphat Ukrainian Catholic Cathedral in the Ukrainian Catholic Eparchy of Edmonton, Alberta
- St. Josaphat Ukrainian Catholic Church of Trenton, NJ

In Croatia, Josaphat is patron saint of parishes in Rajevo Selo and Sibinj.

==== Society of St. Josaphat ====
During the 1990s, a group of Byzantine Rite Traditionalist Catholic priests and laity, who had survived the underground Church during the 1947-1987 religious persecution by the Soviet Government and the Russian Orthodox Church, founded the Priestly Society of Saint Josaphat in protest against the allegedly modernistic theology and actions of the UGCC hierarchy which had arrived from the Ukrainian diaspora since the collapse of the Soviet Union. They are closely linked to the Society of St. Pius X, which is critical of both the Second Vatican Council and the Mass of Paul VI.

==== Relic ====
- There is a relic of the saint in the "catacombs" of Holy Trinity Roman Catholic Church in Chicago.
- There are two relics of Saint Josaphat located in the Basilica of St. Josaphat, in Milwaukee Wisconsin. One is located inside the High Altar and the other is located in the lower Chapel. Vatican documentation is presented in the lower Chapel of the authenticity of the relics.

=== Controversy ===
Josaphat's canonization has been highly controversial among Ukrainian Orthodox population, mostly due to persecution of Orthodox practices incited by Josaphat. These practices include the arrest of Orthodox priests for holding liturgies. Such actions led the Roman Catholic chancellor Lew Sapieha to write a letter to Josaphat in behalf of the King, condemning him for his actions and claiming that his persecution was his own fault.

== See also ==
- Blessed Josaphata Hordashevska - Foundress of the Sisters Servants of Mary Immaculate and missionary under patronage of St. Josaphat
- List of Catholic saints
- Saint Josaphat Kuntsevych, patron saint archive

Religious titles
Preceded by Gedeon	Archbishop of Polotsk; 1618–1623	Succeeded by Antonius Sielava
