= List of movements that dispute the legitimacy of a reigning monarch =

This is a list of movements that dispute the legitimacy of a reigning monarch. It includes those movements that believe a current monarch is on the throne unlawfully, but does not include groups that oppose monarchy generally (such as those that favor replacing a monarchy with a republican system of government).

== Carlism ==
Carlism is a movement that seeks the establishment of another line of the Bourbon family on the Spanish throne, in preference to the current Spanish King, Felipe VI. Carlists dispute that Ferdinand VII had the authority to change the Spanish monarchy's line of succession by issuing the Pragmatic Sanction of 1830 and claim that such document was without legal effect. The Pragmatic Sanction resulted in Fernando's daughter Isabella II, rather than his brother, Infante Carlos, becoming the Spanish monarch.

== Jacobitism ==
Jacobitism asserted that the Glorious Revolution and the overthrow of James II was unlawful and effected a de facto but not de jure change in the line of succession to the British Monarchy. In the Jacobite view, William and Mary of Orange and their successors were never legitimate British rulers. Instead, the lawful monarch of England and Scotland continued to be the descendants of James II and, subsequently, the heir-general of the House of Stuart. Aside from the brief Neo-Jacobite Revival in the years before the First World War, and a handful of modern adherents, any support for the Jacobite succession had disappeared by the end of the 18th century after it had been abandoned by even the inner core of its supporters as a result of the failure of the Jacobite rising of 1745 and the death of Charles Edward Stuart in 1788. Although there are a small number of modern-day self-described 'Jacobites', not all of them support the restoration of the Jacobite succession to the throne.

== Gustavians ==
The Gustavians (Swedish: Gustavianerna) were a political movement in the Kingdom of Sweden that supported King Gustav III of Sweden's absolutist government and attempted to uphold his legacy and defend the interests of his descendants of the House of Holstein-Gottorp following his assassination in 1792.

== Palmarians ==
The Palmarians hold that the last Pope in the Vatican was Pope Paul VI, and that the succession afterwards passed to Clemente Domínguez y Gómez, when he was mystically crowned Pope by Jesus Christ himself in August 1978.

== Conclavists ==
The many groups of conclavists all hold the position that a conclave (outside the authority of the Holy See, sometimes consisting entirely of laymen) can be convened to elect a new Pope, and at that point cease to be sedevacantists. Palmarians are one such group, and another is the followers of David Bawden (whose conclave included his own mother) and of Rogelio del Rosario Martinez after the former's death: referred to as Popes Michael I and Michael II respectively.

== Sedevacantism ==
Sedevacantism holds that the current pope is illegitimate. More generally, sedevacantists believe that the Chair of Saint Peter has been vacant since the death of Pope Pius XII in 1958 or Pope John XXIII in 1963 and that subsequent holders of the papal throne have not been true popes. This movement is largely driven by opposition to liturgical reforms introduced by the Second Vatican Council, especially replacement of the Tridentine Mass with the Mass of Paul VI and authorizing the saying of the Mass in vernacular languages rather than ecclesiastical Latin.

== Movements in former monarchies ==
These are movements which started in opposition to the ruling monarch and might have continued after the abolishment of the monarchy.

=== Miguelism ===
Miguelism was a Portuguese movement named after king Miguel I of Portugal.

The death of King John VI of Portugal (1826) created a dispute over royal succession. While Dom Pedro, the Emperor of Brazil, was the king's oldest son, his younger brother Miguel contended that Pedro had forfeited his claim to the Portuguese throne by declaring Brazil's independence.

Pedro briefly entitled himself king (as Pedro IV of Portugal). Neither the Portuguese nor the Brazilians wanted a unified monarchy again. So, Pedro abdicated in favor of his daughter, Maria, a child of 7, with his sister Isabel Maria as regent.

However, the absolutist party of the landowners and the Church, were not satisfied with this compromise, and they continued to regard Miguel as the legitimate successor to the throne on the grounds that according to the Portuguese succession rules (approved by the Cortes after the 1640 Restoration), Pedro had lost the right to the Portuguese crown, when he took possession of a foreign crown (Brazil). They also were alarmed by the liberal reforms that had been initiated in Spain by the liberals.

In February 1828, Miguel returned to Portugal to take the oath of allegiance to the Charter and assume the regency. The Cortes of 1828 proclaiming him king as Miguel I of Portugal and he reigned from 1828 to 1834.

But in the end (after the Liberal Wars) the Miguelists (absolutists) were defeated and the king was exiled.

=== Legitimism ===
The Legitimists (French: Légitimistes) are royalists in France who adhere to the rights of dynastic succession of the descendants of the elder branch of the Bourbon dynasty, which was overthrown in the 1830 July Revolution.

=== Orléanism ===
The Orléanists (French: Orléanistes), are the French royalists who support the right to the throne of the House of Orléans, which was overthrown in the Revolution of 1848. They disputed the legitimacy of Napoleon III during the Second French Empire that he established.

=== Amanullah loyalism ===
Amanullah loyalism was a political movement to reinstate Amanullah Khan as king of Afghanistan after he was deposed in January 1929. It was active until the late 1940s.
