= Antipope Gregory XVII =

Antipope Gregory XVII may refer to:

- Clemente Domínguez y Gómez (1946–2005), self-proclaimed pope, leader of the Palmarian Catholic Church
- Jean-Gaston Tremblay (1928–2011), self-proclaimed pope, leader of the Apostles of Infinite Love

== See also ==
- Giuseppe Siri conspiracy theory, the claim that Cardinal Giuseppe Siri was elected pope in 1958, with the name Gregory XVII
- Earthly Powers, a novel by Anthony Burgess that includes a character named Pope Gregory XVII
