= Lucian Pulvermacher =

American Catholic priest (1918–2009)

Antipope Pius XIII
- Church: True Catholic Church
- Papacy began: 24 October 1998
- Papacy ended: 30 November 2009
- Opposed to: John Paul II; Benedict XVI

Personal details
- Born: Earl Pulvermacher; 20 April 1918 Rock, Wisconsin, United States
- Died: 30 November 2009 (aged 91) Springdale, Washington, United States

Lucian Pulvermacher (born Earl Pulvermacher, 20 April 1918 – 30 November 2009) was an American Catholic priest and claimant to the papacy. He was the head of the True Catholic Church, a small conclavist group that elected him Pope Pius XIII in Montana in October 1998. At the time of his death, he lived in Springdale, Washington, United States.

== Life and career ==
=== Early life ===
Born on April 20, 1918, in Rock, Wisconsin, near Marshfield, Earl Pulvermacher was one of nine children of a farm family. His three brothers (Robert, Omer, and Gerald) also became priests in the Capuchin Order.

=== Capuchin friar ===
In 1942, at the age of 24, he joined the Capuchin Order, taking the religious name Lucian. He was subsequently ordained to the priesthood on June 5, 1946. At first he was posted to a parish in Milwaukee, but in 1948 he was sent to the Ryukyu Islands of Japan. He spent the greater part of his career as a Capuchin (from 1948 to 1970) in the Ryukyu Islands, including Okinawa. In 1970, he was transferred from Japan to Queensland in Australia, where he continued his missionary work until his disillusionment with the changes that followed the Second Vatican Council of 1962–1965.

=== Traditionalist ministry ===
In January 1976 he left the Capuchin Order and returned to the United States to join forces with traditionalist priest Conrad Altenbach in Milwaukee. "I was without money," he later remembered, "without a home or anything. The few things I brought along with me I could carry in two bags." He left what he called "the Novus Ordo, bogus Council Vatican II Church" and began to collaborate with the Society of Saint Pius X, which rejected Vatican II, until he distanced himself from them as he adopted more extreme sedevacantist views. He later wrote that he had spent eight months "with the general Latin Mass traditionalists until I saw there was no unity. Hence, I am alone on the job here in the States since August 1976."

From 1976 on, Pulvermacher lived with his parents in Pittsville, Wisconsin, celebrating Mass in the traditional rite in private chapels, until 1992, when he moved his ministry to Antigo, Wisconsin. By 1995 he had adopted conclavist views. In 1998 he moved to Kalispell, Montana, invited to say Mass in a chapel there.

In October 1998 a group of sedevacantist lay Catholics met in Kalispell, constituting a conclave for a papal election. They elected him, and he adopted the title of "Pope Pius XIII". From Montana he issued statements, appointed advisors as cardinals, and performed ordination rites. After 2005, he made no more public statements as his health declined.

Pulvermacher died on November 30, 2009.

== See also ==
- Sedevacantism for a more general discussion of this phenomenon
- David Bawden and Manuel Corral for other conclavist claimants to the papacy
