= Michael II (disambiguation) =

Michael II the Stammerer (died in 829) was a Byzantine emperor.

Michael II may also refer to:

- Pope Michael II of Alexandria, ruled 849–851
- Michael II of Duklja, King of Duklja, c. 1101 – 1102
- Michael II Komnenos Doukas of Epirus (died in 1266/68)
- Michael II of Antioch, Syriac Orthodox Patriarch of Antioch (ruled in 1292–1312)
- Patriarch Michael II Fadel, ruled in 1793–1795
- Michael II, Grand Duke of Russia (1878–1918)
- Michael II, Duke of Braganza (1853–1927)
- Rogelio Del Rosario Martinez, called Pope Michael II

== See also ==
- Michael (disambiguation)
