= Avignon Papacy =

Period during which the Pope lived in Avignon, France (1309–1376)

The Avignon Papacy (Occitan: Papat d'Avinhon; French: Papauté d'Avignon) was the period from 1309 to 1376 during which seven successive popes resided in Avignon (at the time within the Kingdom of Arles, part of the Holy Roman Empire, now part of France) rather than in Rome. The situation arose from the conflict between the papacy and the French crown, culminating in the death of Pope Boniface VIII after his arrest and maltreatment by agents of Philip IV of France. Following the subsequent death of Pope Benedict XI, Philip pressured a deadlocked conclave to elect the archbishop of Bordeaux as Pope Clement V in 1305. Clement refused to move to Rome, and in 1309 he moved his court to the papal enclave at Avignon, where it remained for the next 67 years. This absence from Rome is sometimes referred to as the "Babylonian captivity" of the papacy (cf. Italian cattività avignonese, i.e. "Avignonese captivity").

The seven popes that reigned at Avignon were all French, and all under the influence of the French Crown. In 1376, Gregory XI abandoned Avignon and moved his court to Rome, arriving in January 1377. After Gregory's death in 1378, deteriorating relations between his successor Urban VI and a faction of cardinals gave rise to the Western Schism. This started a second line of Avignon popes, subsequently regarded as illegitimate. The last Avignon antipope, Benedict XIII, lost most of his support in 1398, including that of France. After five years besieged by the French, he fled to Perpignan in 1403. The schism ended in 1417 at the Council of Constance.

== Avignon popes ==
Among the popes who resided in Avignon, subsequent Catholic historiography grants legitimacy to these:

- Pope Clement V: 1305–1314 (curia moved to Avignon, 9 March 1309)
- Pope John XXII: 1316–1334
- Pope Benedict XII: 1334–1342
- Pope Clement VI: 1342–1352
- Pope Innocent VI: 1352–1362
- Pope Urban V: 1362–1370 (in Rome 1367–1370; returned to Avignon 1370)
- Pope Gregory XI: 1370–1378 (left Avignon to return to Rome on 13 September 1376)

The two Avignon-based antipopes were:

- Clement VII: 1378–1394
- Benedict XIII: 1394–1423 (expelled from Avignon in 1403)

Benedict XIII was succeeded by three antipopes, who had little or no public following, and were not resident at Avignon:

- Clement VIII: 1423–1429 (recognized in the Crown of Aragon; abdicated)
- Benedict XIV (Bernard Garnier): 1424–1429 or 1430
- Benedict XIV (Jean Carrier): 1430?–1437

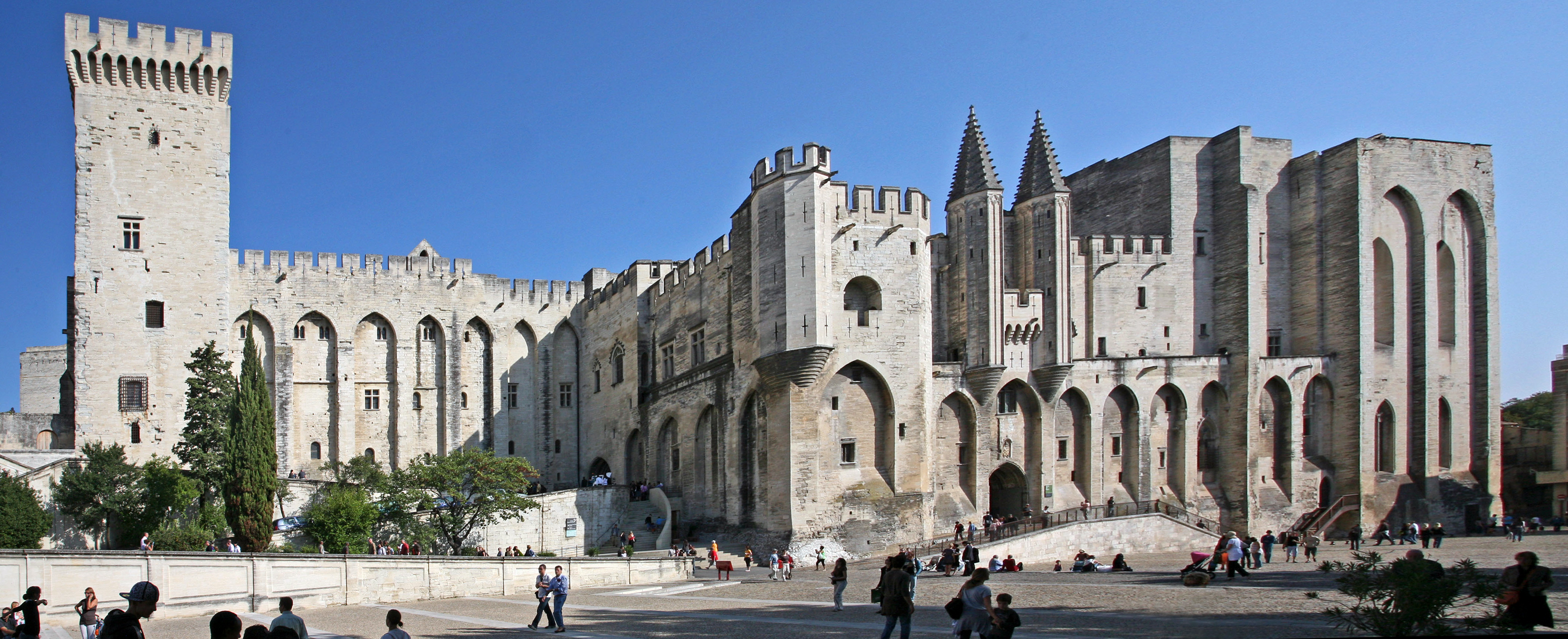
The Papal palace in Avignon, France

The period from 1378 to 1417, when there were rival claimants to the title of pope, is referred to as the "Western Schism" or "the great controversy of the antipopes" by some Catholic scholars and "the second great schism" by many secular and Protestant historians. Parties within the Catholic Church were divided in their allegiance among the various claimants to the office of pope. The Council of Constance finally resolved the controversy in 1417 when the election of Pope Martin V was accepted by all.

Avignon and the small enclave to the east (Comtat Venaissin) remained part of the Papal States until 1791 when, under pressure from French Revolutionaries, they were absorbed by the short-lived revolutionary Kingdom of France (1791–92), which, in turn, was abolished in favor of the French First Republic the following year.

== Background ==
=== Temporal role of the Catholic Church ===
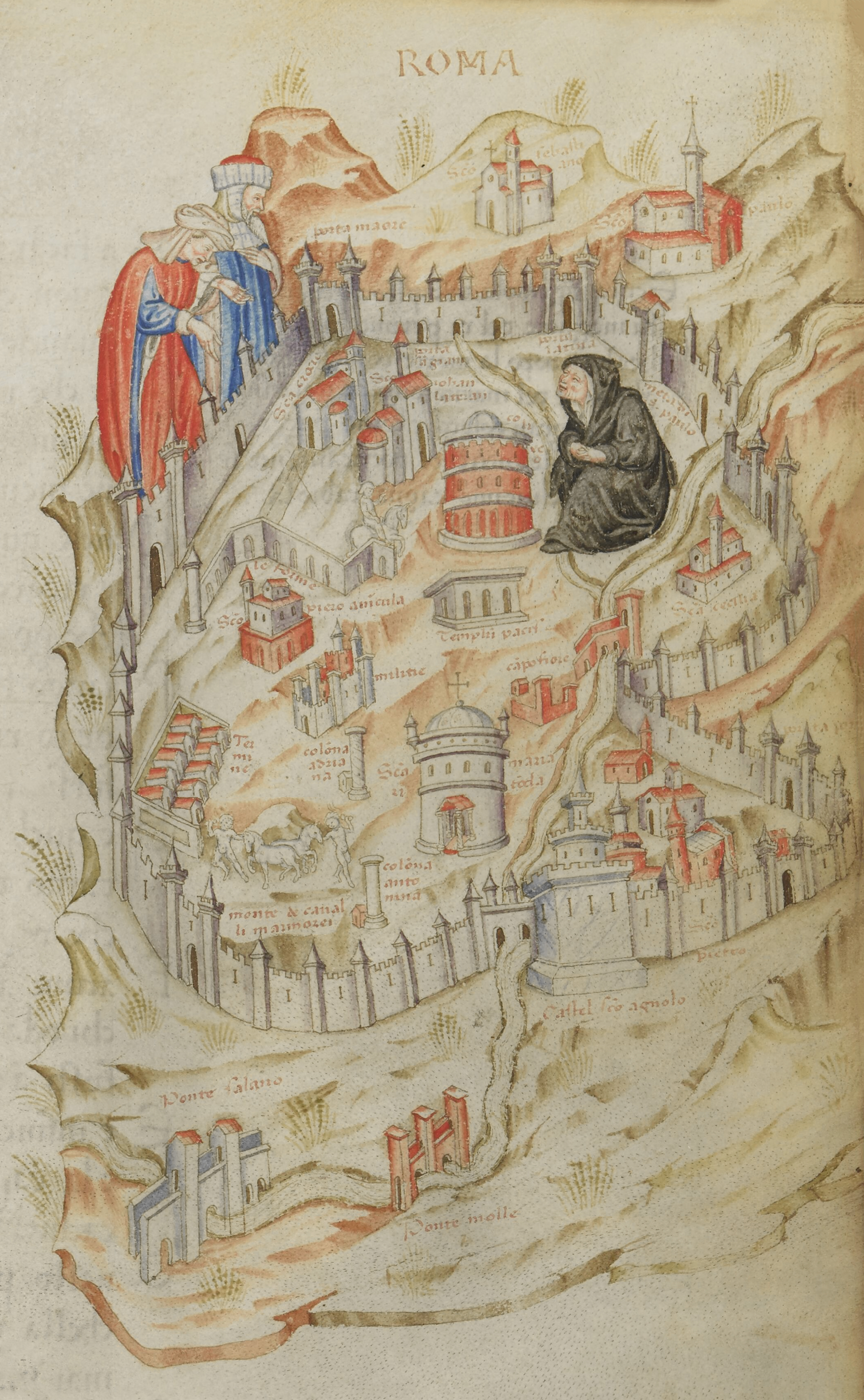
A map of Rome, showing an allegorical figure of Rome as a widow in black mourning the Avignon Papacy

The papacy in the Late Middle Ages played a major temporal role in addition to its spiritual role. The conflict between the pope and the Holy Roman Emperor was fundamentally a dispute over which of them was the leader of Christendom in secular matters. In the early 14th century, the papacy was well past the prime of its secular rule – its importance had peaked in the 12th and 13th centuries. The success of the early Crusades added greatly to the prestige of the popes as secular leaders of Christendom, with monarchs like those of England, France, and even the holy Roman emperor merely acting as marshals for the popes and leading "their" armies. One exception was Frederick II, Holy Roman Emperor, who was twice excommunicated by the pope during a Crusade. Frederick II ignored this and was moderately successful in the Holy Land.

King Philip IV of France wanted to use the finances of the Church to pay for his war with the English. Pope Boniface VIII protested, leading to a feud.

This state of affairs culminated in the unbridled declaration of papal supremacy, Unam sanctam, in November 1302. In that papal bull, Pope Boniface VIII decreed that "it is necessary to salvation that every human creature be subject to the Roman pontiff." This was directed primarily to King Philip IV of France who responded by saying, "Let thy foolishness know that in temporal things we are subject to no man."

In 1303, Pope Boniface VIII followed up with a bull that would excommunicate the king of France and put an interdict over all France. Before this was finalized, Italian allies of the king of France broke into the papal residence and beat Pope Boniface VIII. He died shortly thereafter. Nicholas Boccasini was elected as his successor and took the name Pope Benedict XI. He absolved King Philip IV and his subjects of their actions against Pope Boniface VIII, though the culprits who assaulted Boniface were excommunicated and ordered to appear before a pontifical tribunal. Benedict XI died within eight months of being elected to the papacy. After eleven months, Bertrand de Got, a Frenchman and a personal friend of King Philip IV, was elected as pope and took the name Pope Clement V.

Beginning with Clement V, elected 1305, all popes during the Avignon papacy were French. However, this makes French influence seem greater than it was. Southern France (Occitania) at that time had a culture quite independent from northern France, where most of the advisers to the king of France were based. The Kingdom of Arles was not yet part of France, instead being formally a part of the Holy Roman Empire. The literature produced by the troubadours in Languedoc is unique and strongly distinct from that of royal circles in the north. Even in terms of religion, the south produced its own variety of Christianity, Catharism, which was ultimately declared heretical. The movement was fueled in no small part by the strong sense of independence in the south even though the region had been severely weakened during the Albigensian Crusade a hundred years before. By the time of the Avignon Papacy, the power of the French king in this region was dominant, although still not legally binding.

A stronger impact was made by the move of the Roman Curia from Rome to Poitiers in France in 1305, and then to Avignon in 1309. Following the impasse during the previous conclave, and to escape from the infighting of the powerful Roman families that had produced earlier Popes, such as the Colonna and Orsini families, the Catholic Church looked for a safer place and found it in Avignon, which was surrounded by the lands of the papal fief of Comtat Venaissin. Formally it was part of Arles, but in reality it was under strong French royal influence.

During its time in Avignon, the papacy adopted many features of the Royal court: the life-style of its cardinals was more reminiscent of princes than clerics; more and more French cardinals, often relatives of the ruling pope, took key positions, with the memory of Pope Boniface VIII still fresh.

=== Centralization of Church administration ===
The temporal role of the Catholic Church increased the pressure upon the papal court to emulate the governmental practices and procedures of secular courts. The Catholic Church successfully reorganised and centralized its administration under Clement V and John XXII. The papacy now directly controlled the appointments of benefices, abandoning the customary election process that traditionally allotted this considerable income.

Many other forms of payment brought riches to the Holy See and its cardinals: tithes, a ten-percent tax on Church property; annates, the income of the first year after filling a position such as a bishopric; special taxes for crusades that never took place; and many forms of dispensation, from the entering of benefices without basic qualifications like literacy for newly appointed priests to the request of a converted Jew to visit his unconverted parents. Popes such as John XXII, Benedict XII, and Clement VI reportedly spent fortunes on expensive wardrobes, and silver and gold plates were used at banquets.

Overall the public life of leading Church members began to resemble the lives of princes rather than members of the clergy. This splendour and corruption at the head of the Church found its way to the lower ranks: when a bishop had to pay up to a year's income for gaining a benefice, he sought ways of raising this money from his new office. This was taken to extremes by the pardoners who sold Indulgences. While pardoners were hated but popularly regarded as helpful to redeem one's soul, friars were commonly regarded as failing to follow the Church's moral commandments by ignoring their vows of chastity and poverty and were despised. This sentiment strengthened movements calling for a return to absolute poverty, relinquishment of all personal and ecclesiastical belongings, and preaching as the Lord and his disciples had.

=== A political church ===
For the Catholic Church, an institution embedded in the secular structure and its focus on property, this was a dangerous development, and beginning in the early 14th century, most of these movements were declared heretical. These included the Fraticelli and Waldensian movements in Italy. Furthermore, the display of wealth by the upper ranks of the Church, which contrasted with the common expectation of poverty and strict adherence to principles, was used by enemies of the papacy to raise charges against the popes; King Philip of France employed this strategy, as did Louis IV, Holy Roman Emperor. In his conflict with the latter, Pope John XXII excommunicated two leading philosophers, Marsilius of Padua and William of Ockham, who were outspoken critics of the papacy, and who had found refuge with Louis IV in Munich. In response, Ockham charged the pope with heresy for attacking the doctrine of Apostolic poverty and the Rule of Saint Francis, which had been endorsed by previous popes.

The proceedings against the Knights Templar in the Council of Vienne are representative of this time, reflecting the various powers and their relationships. In 1312, the collegium at Vienne convened to make a ruling concerning the Templars. The council, overall unconvinced about the guilt of the order as a whole, was unlikely to condemn the entire order based on the scarce evidence brought forward. Exerting massive pressure in order to gain part of the substantial funds of the order, the king managed to get the ruling he wanted, and Pope Clement V ordered by decree the suppression of the order.

In the cathedral of Saint Maurice in Vienne, the king of France and his son, the king of Navarre, were sitting next to him when he issued the decree. Under pain of excommunication, no one was allowed to speak at that occasion except when asked by the Pope. The Templars who appeared in Vienne to defend their order were not allowed to present their case – the cardinals of the collegium originally ruled that they should be allowed to raise a defense, but the arrival of the king of France in Vienne put pressure on the collegium, and that decision was revoked.

== Papacy in the 14th century ==
=== Curia ===
After the arrest of the bishop of Pamiers by Philip IV of France in 1301, Pope Boniface VIII issued the bull Salvator Mundi, retracting all privileges granted to the French king by previous popes, and a few weeks later Ausculta fili with charges against the king, summoning him before a council to Rome. In a bold assertion of papal sovereignty, Boniface declared that "God has placed us over the Kings and Kingdoms."

In response, Philip wrote "Your venerable conceitedness may know, that we are nobody's vassal in temporal matters," and called for a meeting of the Estates General, a council of the lords of France, who had supported his position. The king of France issued charges of sodomy, simony, sorcery, and heresy against the pope and summoned him before the council. The pope's response was the strongest affirmation to date of papal sovereignty. In Unam sanctam (18 November 1302), he decreed that "it is necessary to salvation that every human creature be subject to the Roman pontiff."

He was preparing a bull that would excommunicate the king of France and put the interdict over France when in September 1303, William Nogaret, the strongest critic of the papacy in the French inner circle, led a delegation to Rome, with intentionally loose orders by the king to bring the pope, if necessary by force, before a council to rule on the charges brought against him. Nogaret coordinated with the cardinals of the Colonna family, long-standing rivals against whom the pope had even preached a crusade earlier in his papacy. In 1303, French and Italian troops attacked Pope Boniface VIII in Anagni, his home town, and arrested him; he was freed three days later by the population of Anagni, but the effects of his imprisonment led to his death a few weeks later.

=== Cooperation ===
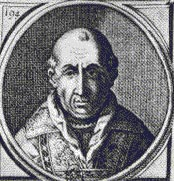
Clement V in a later engraving

In reaction to the intransigence of popes like Boniface VIII, the French tightened their influence under the papacy, eventually reducing the popes to puppets and stacking the Papal court with French clerics.

The death of Pope Boniface VIII deprived the papacy of its most able politician who could stand against the secular power of the king of France. After the conciliatory papacy of Benedict XI (1303–04), Pope Clement V (1305–1314) became the next pontiff. He was born in Gascony, in southern France, but was not directly connected to the French court. He owed his election to the French clerics. He decided against moving to Rome and established his court in Avignon. In this situation of dependency on powerful neighbours in France, three principles characterized the politics of Clement V: the suppression of heretic movements (such as the Cathars in southern France); the reorganization of the internal administration of the church; and the preservation of an untainted image of the church as the sole instrument of God's will on earth.

The latter was directly challenged by Philip IV when he demanded a posthumous trial of his former adversary, the late Boniface VIII, for alleged heresy. Philip exerted strong influence on the cardinals of the collegium, and compliance with his demand could mean a severe blow to the church's authority. Much of Clement's politics was designed to avoid such a blow, which he finally did (persuading Philip to leave the trial to the Council of Vienne, where it lapsed). However, the price won concessions on various fronts; despite strong personal doubts, Clement supported Philip's proceedings against the Templars, and he personally ruled to suppress the order.

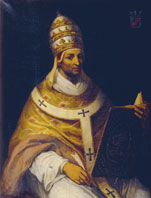
John XXII

One important issue during the papacy of Pope John XXII (born Jacques Duèze in Cahors, and previously archbishop in Avignon) was his conflict with Louis IV, Holy Roman Emperor, who denied the sole authority of the pope to crown the emperor. Louis followed the example of Philip IV, and summoned the nobles of Germany to back his position. Marsilius of Padua justified secular supremacy in the territory of the Holy Roman Empire. This conflict with the Emperor, often fought out in expensive wars, drove the papacy even more into the arms of the French king.

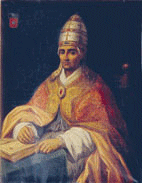
Benedict XII

Pope Benedict XII (1334–1342), born Jacques Fournier in Pamiers, was previously active in the inquisition against the Cathar movement. In contrast to the rather bloody picture of the Inquisition in general, he was reported to be very careful about the souls of the examined, taking a lot of time in the proceedings. His interest in pacifying southern France was also motivation for mediating between the king of France and the king of England, before the outbreak of the Hundred Years' War.

=== Submission ===
Under Pope Clement VI (1342–1352) the French interests started dominating the papacy. Clement VI had been Archbishop of Rouen and adviser to Philip VI before, so his links to the French court were much stronger than those of his predecessors. At some point he even financed French war efforts out of his own pockets. He reportedly had a luxurious wardrobe and under his rule the extravagant lifestyle in Avignon reached new heights.

Clement VI was also pope during the Black Death, the epidemic that swept through Europe between 1347 and 1350 and is believed to have killed about one-third of Europe's population. Also during his reign in 1348, the Avignon papacy bought the city of Avignon from the Angevins.

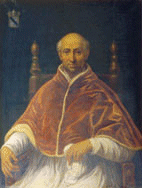
Clement VI

Pope Innocent VI (1352–1362), born Etienne Aubert, was less partisan than Clement VI. He was keen on establishing peace between France and England, having worked to this end in papal delegations in 1345 and 1348. His gaunt appearance and austere manners commanded higher respect in the eyes of nobles at both sides of the conflict. However, he was also indecisive and impressionable, already an old man when being elected Pope. In this situation, the king of France managed to influence the papacy, although papal legates played key roles in various attempts to stop the conflict.

Most notably in 1353, the bishop of Porto, Guy de Boulogne, tried to set up a conference. After initial successful talks the effort failed, largely due to the mistrust from the English side over Guy's strong ties with the French court. In a letter Innocent VI himself wrote to the Duke of Lancaster: "Although we were born in France and although for that and other reasons we hold the realm of France in special affection, yet in working for peace we have put aside our private prejudices and tried to serve the interests of everyone."

With Pope Urban V (1362–1370), the control by Charles V of France of the papacy became more direct. Urban V himself is described as the most austere of the Avignon popes after Benedict XII and probably the most spiritual of all. However, he was not a strategist and made substantial concessions to the French crown especially in finances, a crucial issue during the war with England. In 1369, Pope Urban V supported the marriage of Philip the Bold of the Duchy of Burgundy and Margaret III, Countess of Flanders, rather than giving dispensation to one of Edward III of England's sons to marry Margaret. This clearly showed the partisanship of the papacy; correspondingly, the respect for the church dropped.

=== War of the Eight Saints ===
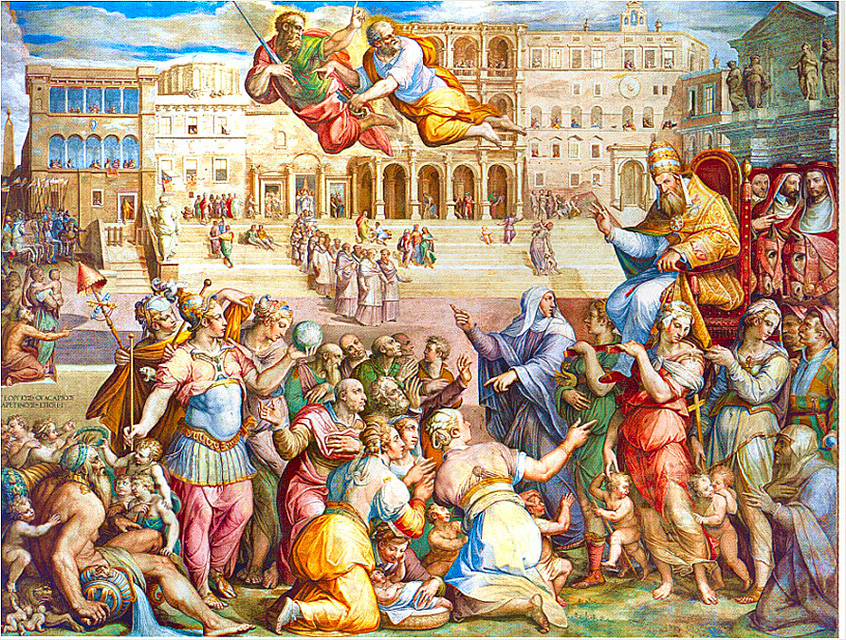
Pope Gregory XI returned to Rome in 1376 and ended the Avignon Papacy.

The most influential decision in the reign of Pope Gregory XI (1370–1378) was the return to Rome, beginning on 13 September 1376 and ending with his arrival on 17 January 1377. Although the Pope was French born and still under strong influence by the French king, the increasing conflict between factions friendly and hostile to the Pope posed a threat to the papal lands and to the allegiance of Rome itself. When the papacy established an embargo against grain exports during a food scarcity 1374 and 1375, Florence organized several cities into a league against the papacy: Milan, Bologna, Perugia, Pisa, Lucca and Genoa.

The papal legate, Robert of Geneva, a relative of the House of Savoy, pursued a particularly ruthless policy against the league to re-establish control over these cities. He convinced Pope Gregory to hire Breton mercenaries. To quell an uprising of the inhabitants of Cesena, he involved John Hawkwood and had the majority of the people massacred (between 2,500 and 3,500 people were reported dead). Following such events opposition against the papacy strengthened.

Florence came in open conflict with the pope, a conflict called "the war of the eight saints" in reference to the eight Florentine councilors who were chosen to orchestrate the conflict. The entire city of Florence was excommunicated and as reply the forwarding of clerical taxes was stopped. Trade was seriously hampered and both sides had to find a solution. In his decision about returning to Rome, the pope was also under the influence of Catherine of Siena, later canonized, who preached for a return to Rome.

=== Schism ===
This resolution was short-lived when, having returned the papal court to Rome, Pope Gregory XI died. A conclave met and elected an Italian pope, Urban VI. Pope Urban alienated the French cardinals, who held a second conclave electing one of their own, Robert of Geneva, who took the name Clement VII, to succeed Gregory XI, thus beginning a second line of Avignon popes. Clement VII and his successors are not regarded as legitimate, and are referred to as antipopes by the Catholic Church. This situation, known as the Western Schism, persisted from 1378 until the ecumenical Council of Constance (1414–1418) settled the question of papal succession and declared the French conclave of 1378 to be invalid. A new pope, Pope Martin V, was elected in 1417; other claimants to succeed to the Avignon line (though not resident at Avignon) continued until c. 1437.

== Legacy ==
The period has been called the "Babylonian captivity" of the popes. When and where this term originated is uncertain although it may have sprung from Petrarch, who in a letter to a friend (1340–1353) written during his stay at Avignon, described Avignon of that time as the "Babylon of the west", referring to the worldly practices of the church hierarchy. The nickname is polemical, in referring to the claim by critics that the prosperity of the church at that time was accompanied by a profound compromise of the papacy's spiritual integrity, especially in the alleged subordination of the powers of the church to the ambitions of the French kings.

As noted, the "captivity" of the popes at Avignon lasted about the same amount of time as the exile of the Jews in Babylon, making the analogy convenient and rhetorically potent. The Avignon papacy has been and is often today depicted as being totally dependent on the French kings, and sometimes as even being treacherous to its spiritual role and its heritage in Rome.

== Effects on the papacy ==
The relationship between the papacy and France changed drastically over the course of the 14th century. Starting with open conflict between Pope Boniface VIII and King Philip IV of France, it turned to cooperation from 1305 to 1342, and finally to a papacy under strong influence by the French throne up to 1378. Such partisanship of the papacy was one of the reasons for the dropping esteem for the institution, which in turn was one of the reasons for the schism from 1378 to 1417.

In the period of the Schism, the power struggle in the papacy became a battlefield of the major powers, with France supporting the antipopes in Avignon and England supporting the popes in Rome. During the Schism, papal allegiance increasingly followed political and dynastic divisions, with France generally supporting the Avignon line and England supporting the Roman line.

== See also ==
- Caesaropapism – System with state control of the Church
- Châteauneuf-du-Pape
- Gallicanism – Rejection of ultramontanism
- Lollardy – Radical Christian reform movement
- Medieval Restorationism
- Palais des papes of Sorgues

== Sources ==
- Bouchard, Constance B. (1999). "Burgundy and Provence, 879–1032". The New Cambridge Medieval History. Vol. 3. Cambridge: Cambridge University Press. pp. 328–345.
- Brackney, William H. (2012). Historical Dictionary of Radical Christianity. Scarecrow Press. ISBN 978-0-8108-7179-3.
- Fleck, Cathleen A. (2009). "Seeking Legitimacy: Art and Manuscripts for the Popes in Avignon from 1378 to 1417". In Rollo-Koster, Joëlle; Izbicki, Thomas M. (eds.). A Companion to the Great Western Schism (1378–1417). Brill.
- Hollister, Warren; Bennett, Judith (2002). Medieval Europe: A Short History (9 ed.). Boston, Massachusetts: McGraw-Hill Companies Incorporated. ISBN 9780072346572.
- Kamp, N (1995). "Federico II di Svevia, imperatore, re di Sicilia e di Gerusalemme, re dei Romani". Dizionario Biografico degli Italiani (in Italian). Vol. 45. Treccani.
- Kirsch, Johann Peter (1910). "Pedro de Luna". The Catholic Encyclopedia. Robert Appleton Company.
- McBrien, Richard P. (1997). Lives of the Popes. HarperCollins.
- Van Cleve, T. C. (1972). The Emperor Frederick II of Hohenstaufen: Immutator Mundi. Oxford. ISBN 0-198-22513-X.
