= Conclavism =

Electing of a rival pope by self-selected groups

Conclavism is the practice that has existed since the second half of the 20th century which consists in the convening of a pseudo-conclave to elect rival popes (antipopes) to the current pope of Rome. This method is used by some fringe Catholics, often Sedevacantists, who do not accept the legitimacy of the present papacy. Those who hold the position that a conclave can be convened to elect an antipope to contest or rival the current Bishop of Rome are called conclavists.

This claim is usually associated with the claim known as sedevacantism, which asserts that the present holder of the title Bishop of Rome is not pope, which implies that the Holy See is vacant, or in a state of sede vacante. Many Sedevacantists are not Conclavists, however.

The term "Conclavism" comes from the word "conclave", the term for a meeting of the College of Cardinals convened to elect a bishop of Rome, when that see is vacant.

Conclavism is different from what George Chryssides calls the "mysticalists" phenomenon, i.e. people declaring themselves popes after receiving a personal mystical revelation. This is because in the mysticalists' cases, no human institution is used to appoint a pope; an example of mysticalists is the Apostles of Infinite Love. Mysticalists are therefore not Conclavists according to this definition.

== Description ==
The description and explanation of conclavism of George Chryssides is:

Since most sedevacantists (although not all) object to Pope John XXIII's modernization of the Roman Catholic Church, they argue that he nullified his appointment to the papacy in 1958. It is therefore inferred that the conclave of cardinals who elected him was also invalid. Conclavists, however, hold that the method of electing a pope by a conclave remains the valid process and hence that it is necessary for a conclave to be reconstituted and convened. Since none of the members of that Pope John XXIII conclave remain alive, one must resort to the principle of epikeia ('reasonableness'), and that membership of a conclave should be drawn from the faithful community who are invited.

== History ==
Conclavism originated around the late 1960s and early 1970s, with one of the earliest proponents of the concept of reconvening a conclave being Joaquín Sáenz y Arriaga, a Mexican priest.

In the late 1980s, David Bawden promoted the idea of an antipapal election, and ultimately sent out over 200 copies of a book of his to the editors of all the sedevacantist publications he could find, and to all the priests listed in a directory of traditionalists as being sedevacantist. He was then elected in 1990 by a group of six people who included himself and his parents, and took the name "Pope Michael".

== List of Papal claimants ==
- Michael I (David Allen Bawden): In 1990 six people, including Bawden's parents, elected Bawden, who took the name Pope Michael. He died on 2 August 2022 and was succeeded by Rogelio Martinez, who took the name of Pope Michael II, in July 2023.
- Linus II (Victor von Pentz): Another conclave, this time held in Assisi, Italy, in 1994, elected South African Victor von Pentz, an ex-seminarian of the Society of St Pius X, as Pope Linus II. Linus took up residence in Hertfordshire, England. He was inactive for most of his reign and died in 2021.
- Pius XIII (Lucian Pulvermacher): In October 1998, the U.S.-based True Catholic Church elected Pulvermacher as Pope Pius XIII. He died on 30 November 2009. No successor was named.
- Leo XIV (Oscar Michaelli): On 24 March 2006, a group of 34 calling themselves the "Catholic Apostolic Remnant Church" elected the Argentine Michaelli as Pope Leo XIV. On his death in 2008, Michaelli was succeeded by Juan Bautista Bonetti, who took the name of Pope Innocent XIV but resigned three months later. He was succeeded by Alejandro Tomas Cardinal Greico, who took the name of Pope Alexander IX. By coincidence, the name "Leo XIV" would later be taken by American cardinal Robert Prevost upon his own election to the papacy in 2025.

== See also ==
- Antipope
- Sedevacantism
- Sedeprivationism
- Episcopi vagantes
- Independent Catholic Churches
- Traditionalist Catholic
- Palmarian Christian Church
