= Antipope Clement VIII =

Antipope at Avignon from 1423 to 1429

- Bishop of Mallorca
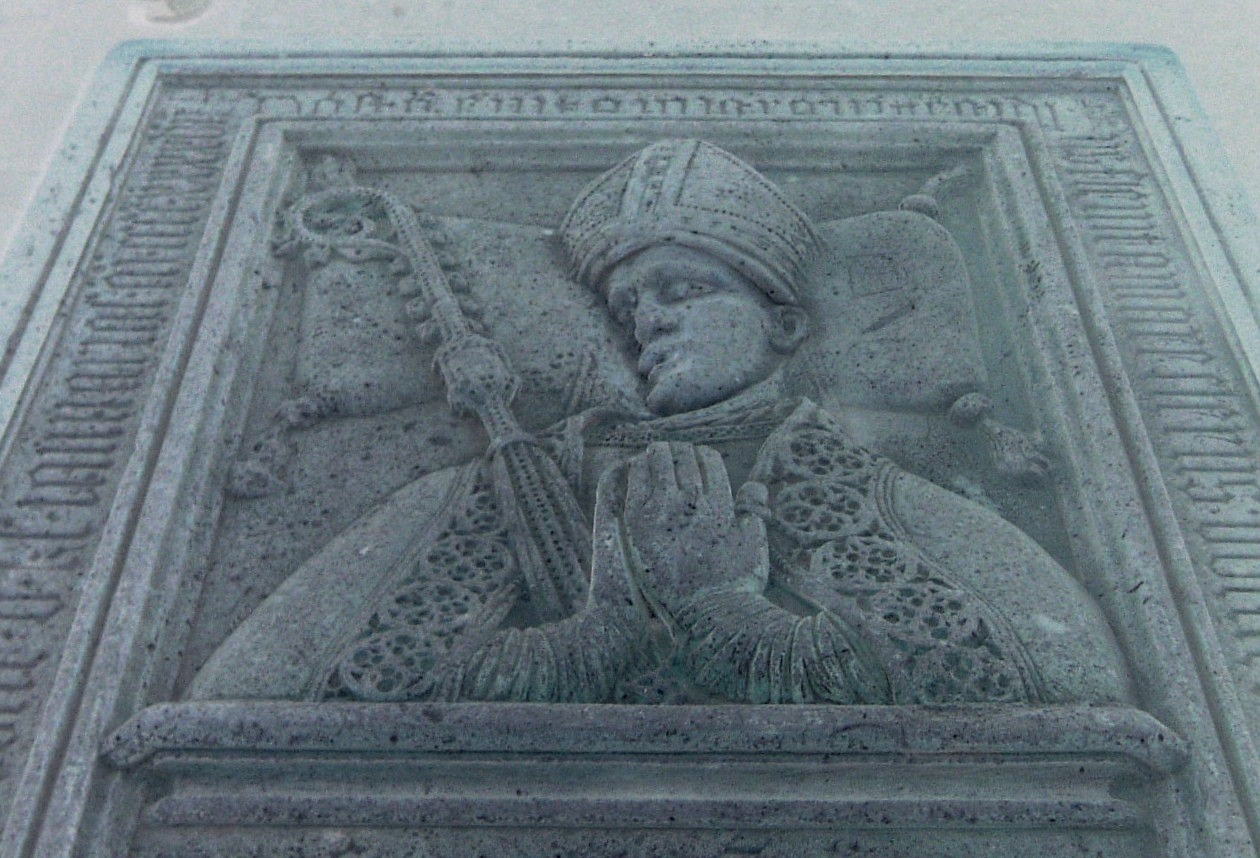
- Tomb of Antipope Clement VIII in Palma Cathedral
- Papacy began: 10 June 1423
- Papacy ended: 26 July 1429
- Predecessor: Roman claimant: Martin V Antipapal (Avignonian) claimant: Benedict XIII
- Successor: Roman claimant: Martin V Antipapal (Avignonian) claimant: Benedict XIV
- Opposed to: Roman claimant: Pope Martin V Other claimant: Benedict XIV (Jean Carrier)
- Other post: Bishop of Mallorca

Personal details
- Born: Gil Sánchez Muñoz y Carbón; 1369 Teruel, Crown of Aragon
- Died: 28 December 1445 or 1446
- Buried: Palma, Kingdom of Majorca

Antipope Clement VIII should not be confused with Pope Clement VIII.

Clement VIII, born Gil Sánchez Muñoz y Carbón (1369/70 – 28 December 1445/46), was one of the antipopes of the Avignon obedience, reigning from 10 June 1423 to 26 July 1429. When King Alfonso V of Aragon reached an agreement with Pope Martin V, Sánchez Muñoz abdicated, made his submission and was appointed bishop of Mallorca.

== Biography ==
Gil Sánchez Muñoz was born in Teruel between 1369 and 1370. He was a friend and advisor of the future Avignon anti-pope Benedict XIII, and member of the Avignon curia. In 1396 he was an envoy to the Bishop of Valencia to get Spanish support.

Benedict had appointed four cardinals, and on his death, three of them, on 10 June 1423, elected Gil Sánchez Muñoz as Pope, who took the name Clement VIII. The fourth, Jean Carrier, absent at the time, declared the election invalid, and elected Bernard Garnier as antipope in turn, who took the name Benedict XIV. Consequently, Jean Carrier was excommunicated by Clement.

Clement's fate was bound up with the ambitions of Alfonso V of Aragon. Alfonso wished to negotiate for Naples, and so gave Clement support; his queen Maria of Castile, and the Aragonese bishops supported Martin V. In the summer of 1423 Alfonso attempted to persuade the Republic of Siena to acknowledge Clement VIII, thus securing recognition for the pope of the Avignon line in the very city where the Roman pope Martin V had convened an ecumenical council of the Church.

However, through the exertions of Cardinal Pierre de Foix, an able diplomat and the King’s kinsman, an agreement was reached between Alfonso and the Pope. Alfonso then sent a delegation in 1428 (headed by Alfonso de Borgia, the future Callixtus III), to persuade Clement to recognise Martin. Clement declared his abdication on 26 July 1429 and had his cardinals elect Oddone Colonna (Martin V) his successor, a formal act precluding future doubts concerning apostolic succession. His abdication was confirmed in mid-August. Clement had to make a penitential submission in forma to Martin V, and when this was done Martin granted Sánchez Muñoz the Bishopric of Mallorca. Sánchez Muñoz died on 28 December 1445 or 1446.

== Sources ==
- Flick, Alexander Clarence (1930). The Decline of the Medieval Church. Vol. 2. K. Paul, Trench, Trubner.
- Hughes, Philip (1979). History of the Church. Vol. 3: The Revolt Against The Church: Aquinas To Luther. Bloomsbury Academic. ISBN 9780722079836.
- Pham, John-Peter (2004). Heirs of the Fisherman: Behind the Scenes of Papal Death and Succession. Oxford University Press. ISBN 9780195346350.
- Walsh, Michael J. (1998). Lives of the popes: Illustrated biographies of every Pope from St Peter to the present. Barnes & Noble Books. ISBN 9780861019601.
- Williams, George L. (1998). Papal Genealogy: The Families And Descendants Of The Popes. McFarland & Co. Inc. ISBN 9780786420711.
