= Benevacantism =

Conspiracy theory that Benedict XVI invalidly resigned

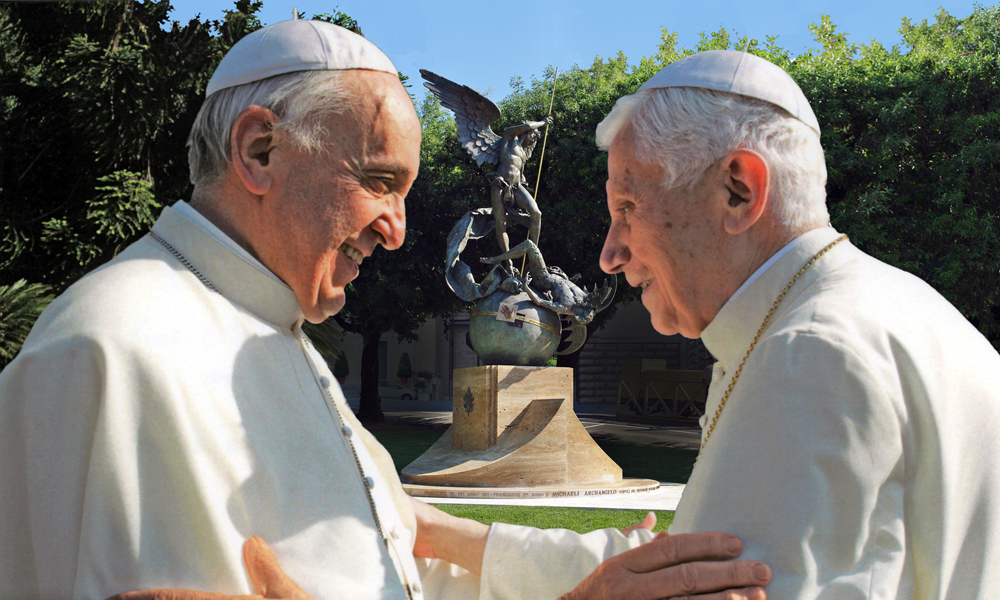
Pope Francis and Pope Emeritus Benedict meeting on 5 July 2013

Benevacantism (a portmanteau of "Benedict" and "sedevacantism" (Note: The term "sedevacantism" comes from the Latin words sede meaning 'seat' and vacante meaning 'vacant', and the Church refers to interregnal periods where there is no Pope as sede vacante. This term is also used by those who profess that the current occupant of the see is not actually the pope.)) is the conspiracy theory that Pope Benedict XVI did not validly resign the papacy in February 2013 and therefore remained pope, making Pope Francis an invalidly elected antipope. Believers of this theory are called "Benevacantists".

Benevacantism emerged in conservative Catholic circles shortly after the election of Pope Francis in response to his less conservative theology. Benevacantists speculate that Benedict's resignation was invalid because Benedict had a faulty understanding of the papacy, or because external pressures made him not able to resign freely.

After Benedict XVI died on 31 December 2022, some Benevacantists recognized Francis (still alive at the time) as the rightful pope while others adopted sedevacantism.

== History ==
=== Background ===
On 11 February 2013, Pope Benedict XVI announced his intention to resign at the Apostolic Palace in the Sala del Concistoro, at an early morning gathering held to announce the date of the canonization of 800 Catholic martyrs. Speaking in Latin, he told the attendees that he had made "a decision of great importance for the life of the church". He cited his deteriorating strength due to old age and the physical and mental demands of the papacy. He also declared that he would continue to serve the Church "through a life dedicated to prayer".

=== Emergence ===
After the election of Pope Francis, disagreement with Francis' less conservative approach to Catholic theology spurred conspiracy theories among conservative Catholics. Noticing that after his resignation Benedict still wore a white cassock (albeit without mozetta) and still asked to be referred to by his regnal name (albeit with the title "emeritus"), questions about the validity of his resignation began to emerge. These were compounded by the observation that Benedict continued to give the apostolic blessing in written letters, a privilege only a reigning pope enjoys, and that he retained the Keys of Heaven on his coat of arms, and continued to wear a version of the Ring of the Fisherman. One of the first writers who talked about Benedict's declaration of resignation, and the relation between munus and ministerium, was Italian canon lawyer Stefano Violi in a theological journal of the University of Lugano in June 2013.

== Theories ==
Benevacantist theories posit that for various reasons Benedict's resignation was invalid, and as such he remained the true pope until his death, thereby causing Francis to be invalidly elected and be an antipope.

=== Undue pressure ===
Early speculation was that the Vatican leaks scandal pressured Benedict into resignation. It also was reported at the time in La Repubblica that the pope's resignation was linked to a "gay mafia" operating within the Vatican: an underground network of high-ranking homosexual clergy, holding sex parties in Rome and the Vatican, and involved with corruption in the Vatican Bank. Given that the 1983 Code of Canon Law states that resignations must be made "freely", coercion or undue pressure to resign would have caused the act to be invalid.

In 2014, Benedict denied that he did not have full freedom in making his decision, and in a 2016 book, The Last Conversations, Benedict downplayed the "gay mafia" rumour, describing it as a group of four or five people who were seeking to influence Vatican decisions that he had succeeded in breaking up.

Peter Seewald, Benedict's biographer, stated that a persistent insomnia since the 2005 World Youth Day in Cologne had been the primary reason for his resignation. Seewald says that a March 2012 incident involving sleeping pills necessitated that he only be able to appear in public in the morning on trips abroad, Benedict decided he needed to resign prior to World Youth Day in Rio de Janeiro in July 2013.

=== Munus vs. ministerium ===
In a speech in May 2016, Georg Gänswein, personal secretary to Pope Benedict, spoke of an "expanded" Petrine office with both an "active" and "contemplative" pope, referring respectively to Francis and Benedict. Benedict had stated in an interview with his biographer Peter Seewald that he saw himself as a father whose role changed, but was still a father. According to Gänswein, Benedict intended to continue in the munus (transl. work – transl. office) of the papacy.

Gänswein stated that Benedict only meant this in an analogical sense and that Benedict did not intend only to partially resign. However, Benevacantists believe that the distinction between the word ministerium (transl. ministry) used by Benedict in his resignation and the word munus in the 1983 Code of Canon Law's canon 332 §2 (Note: Text of Canon 332§2 in Latin and English) indicate that Benedict did not intend to fully resign the papacy, and therefore the resignation was invalid.

Cardinal Raymond Leo Burke, former prefect of the Apostolic Signatura, stated that "it would be difficult to say that [the resignation was] not valid", and added that Benedict uses the words "munus" and "ministerium" interchangeably and without distinction. Other Latinists have stated that munus and ministerium are "more or less synonymous" and that it is clear Benedict meant them to refer to the same thing upon his resignation.

== Denials by Benedict ==
On the eve of the first anniversary of his resignation, Benedict wrote to La Stampa to deny speculation he had been forced to step down. "There isn't the slightest doubt about the validity of my resignation from the Petrine ministry", he wrote in a letter to the newspaper. "The only condition for the validity is the full freedom of the decision. Speculation about its invalidity is simply absurd", he wrote. In an interview on 28 February 2021, Benedict again repeated the legitimacy of his resignation.

== Legacy ==
At least five Italian priests have been excommunicated over publicly expressing Benevacantism, as well as priests in Costa Rica, Spain, and California, and nuns in Spain and Texas. Carlo Maria Viganò, former Apostolic Nuncio to the United States, was excommunicated on 5 July 2024 for similar reasons.

After Benedict's death on 31 December 2022, some former adherents to Benevacantism held to sedevacantism, while others considered Francis to be the pope.

In April 2026, the theory attracted renewed attention following the request by petitioners to access the legal documents relevant to Benedict's resignation. The promoter of justice for Vatican City, Alessandro Diddi, denied the request, but the petition prompted the automatic creation of a file for the investigation. Commentators described this response as “a significant development in the ongoing debate over the 2013 resignation”.

== See also ==
- Giuseppe Siri conspiracy theory
