= Giuseppe Siri conspiracy theory =

Traditionalist Catholic conspiracy theory

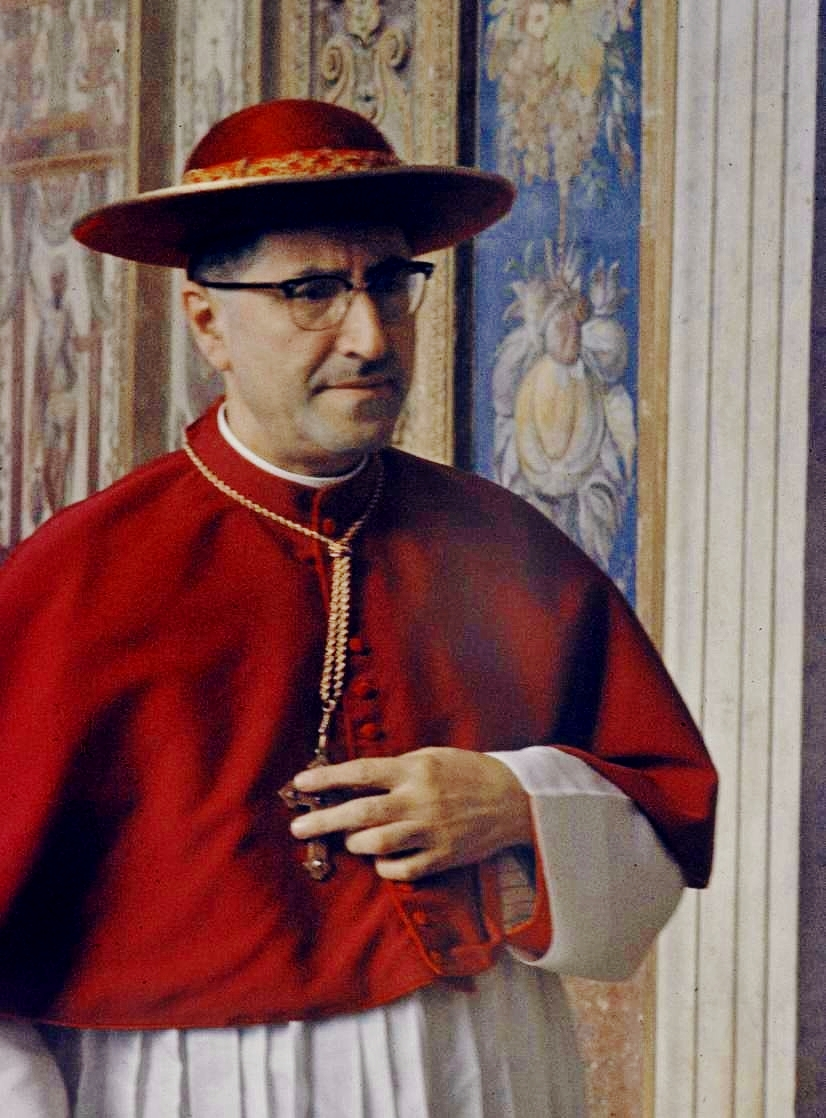
Giuseppe Siri in 1958

A conspiracy theory asserts that Cardinal Giuseppe Siri (then Archbishop of Genoa) was elected pope in the 1958 papal conclave, taking the papal name Pope Gregory XVII, but that his election was suppressed. Siri did not associate himself with this idea. Followers of the theory recognize Siri as "Gregory XVII", and also refer to him as "the Red Pope".

Exponents of this theory claim a prolonged emission of white smoke on the first day of balloting at the conclave indicated the election of Siri, but that threats applied from outside the conclave caused his election to be reversed, allowing Pope John XXIII to be elected two days later. The source of the threats has been variously identified as Jews and Freemasons, or the Soviet Union. Adherents of the theory say the election of John XXIII was invalid and regard him and his successors as imposters and antipopes.

== 1958 conclave ==
On 25 October 1958, the papal conclave to elect a successor to Pope Pius XII commenced. The staunchly conservative Cardinal Siri, then 52 years old, was considered a strong candidate in the election. At 11:53 a.m. on 26 October 1958, the first day of balloting, white smoke was seen coming from the chimney of the Sistine Chapel, a traditional signal to the crowds in the square outside that a pope has been elected. It was followed after a few minutes by black smoke. The Italian radio network and the Italian news agency had to retract their initial reports that a pope had been elected. At 5:53 p.m., white smoke again appeared to come from the chimney, and this time it did not quickly turn black. At 6 p.m., after the smoke had continued white for several minutes, Vatican Radio told the world: "The smoke is white... There is absolutely no doubt. A Pope has been elected." After about half an hour, the smoke turned black, indicating that there was no result. Vatican Radio corrected its report. The New York Times reported: "The crowd lingered for more than a half hour, apparently hoping against hope that a new Pope would appear." The paper further reported that problems getting the straw to catch fire likely caused the morning's problem and added: "The second signal was misunderstood because it came well after nightfall. The smoke was lighted from below by a spotlight, which made black appear white."

The official responsible for arrangements outside the conclave notified the cardinals that the colour of the smoke had been misread and provided them with "smoke torches from a fireworks factory". The third day's four ballots again failed to select a pope and there was no confusion about the colour of the smoke. On the afternoon of the next day, 28 October, white smoke signalled the election of a pope. On their eleventh ballot the conclave had elected Cardinal Angelo Roncalli, who took the name John XXIII.

While considered a favourite for election before the conclave, Siri did not feature in the early voting, and ultimately was never in the running. He was thought too young at 52; an exceptionally long pontificate was anticipated — a prospect that, according to reports, was viewed as undesirable, as a prolonged reign would lead to internal stagnation.

== History of the theory ==
Sometime in the late 1980s, an American traditionalist Catholic named Gary Giuffré began to expound the belief that Siri was the true pope, and that he was being held against his will in Rome. According to Giuffré and supporters of the theory, the white smoke that was seen on 26 October 1958 did indeed mean that a pope had been elected, and that pope was Siri, but he was forced to surrender the papacy in the face of dire threats from outside the conclave, including the threat of a nuclear bomb. With the electors unsure how to proceed, Roncalli, who they claim was a Freemason, supposedly offered himself as a compromise with the promise he would call a synod soon after his election to regularize the unusual situation. Roncalli was elected as John XXIII instead of Siri. The theory further claims that a similar process occurred at the 1963 papal conclave that followed John XXIII's death. Once again white smoke was seen indicating that Siri had been elected, and again it turned black, and under threats from outside the conclave a different cardinal was elected, Giovanni Montini, who took the name Paul VI. During this conclave, it was alleged that the threats of terrible retribution if Siri were elected were passed into the conclave by the B'nai B'rith, working on behalf of a Judeo-Masonic conspiracy.

The assertion that Siri's 1963 election had been set aside after the intervention of the B'nai B'rith was contained in an article written in 1986 by Louis Hubert Remy in the French publication Sous la Bannière and translated into English in 1987 for Dan Jones's newsletter The Sangre de Cristo Newsnotes. That article made no mention of the 1958 conclave.

In the 1990 non-fiction book The Keys of This Blood, Irish-American Catholic priest Malachi Martin claimed that in the 1963 conclave Siri received sufficient votes for election but refused it. According to Martin, the reason Siri refused the election was the belief it was the only method a "grave danger [could] be avoided—but whether harm to the Church, his family, or to him personally, is not clear". Martin also claimed Siri's supposed refusal followed a conversation on the subject of Siri's candidacy between a member of the conclave and somebody outside the conclave, who was "an emissary of an internationally based organisation". In a 1997 interview on the radio programme Steel on Steel, hosted by John Loefller, Martin claimed that Siri had also obtained a majority of votes in the August 1978 papal conclave but that he had received a written note after his election threatening him and his family with death should he accept.

In his 2003 book The Vatican Exposed, Paul L. Williams claimed United States State Department documents confirmed Siri had been elected pope in 1958 as Gregory XVII. According to Williams, the election was quashed not by a Judeo-Masonic conspiracy but by fear of the Soviet Union. He argued that Roncalli was known as the "pink priest" because of his ties with both the French and Italian Communist parties, while Siri was "rabidly anti-Communist". Siri received the requisite number of votes on the third ballot and was elected as Gregory XVII but "the French cardinals annulled the results, claiming that the election would cause widespread riots and the assassination of several prominent bishops behind the Iron Curtain." It was then decided to elect Cardinal Federico Tedeschini but as he was too ill, Roncalli was elected instead. Williams cited "Department of State secret dispatch, 'John XXIII,' issue date: November 20, 1958, declassified: November 11, 1974" and "Department of State secret file, 'Cardinal Siri,' issue date: April 10, 1961, declassified: February 28, 1994" in support of his claims. In subsequent editions, the references were changed to simply "F.B.I. source".

== Significance ==
Traditionalist Catholics oppose the liturgical changes and perceived modernist theological positions resulting from the Second Vatican Council (1962–1965), which many of them see as a heretical council. Sedevacantists are a minority group within traditionalist Catholicism who maintain that none of the popes from John XXIII (who called the council) onward were true popes, and that therefore the papal seat is vacant. The idea that John XXIII and Paul VI were not true popes is explained by the Siri theory. The magazine Inside the Vatican has estimated that the theory was believed "by hundreds, perhaps thousands of people around the world".

== See also ==
- Benevacantism
- Antipopes who assumed the name Gregory XVII:
  - Clemente Domínguez y Gómez, first pope of the Palmarian Catholic Church
  - Jean-Gaston Tremblay, second pope of the Apostles of Infinite Love
