= Antipope =

Person who claims to be the legitimate pope

An antipope (Latin: antipapa) is a person who claims to be Bishop of Rome, the pope and, depending on the time period, the leader of the Catholic Church. Between the 3rd and mid-15th centuries, antipopes were supported by factions within the church itself and secular rulers. While modern claimants to the papacy still take place, they are rarely given serious consideration by either the public or the church.

Sometimes it was difficult for the church officials to distinguish which of the rivaling claimants should be given the title of pope and which of antipope, as in the case of Pope Leo VIII and Pope Benedict V.

== History ==
Hippolytus of Rome (d. 235) is commonly considered to be the earliest antipope, as he headed a separate group within the church in Rome against Pope Callixtus I. Hippolytus was reconciled to Callixtus's second successor, Pope Pontian, and both he and Pontian are honoured as saints by the Catholic Church with a shared feast day on 13 August. Whether two or more persons have been confused in this account of Hippolytus and whether Hippolytus actually declared himself to be the Bishop of Rome remains unclear, since no such claim by Hippolytus has been cited in the writings attributed to him.

Eusebius quotes from an unnamed earlier writer the story of Natalius, a 3rd-century priest who accepted the bishopric of the Adoptionists, a heretical group in Rome. Natalius soon repented and tearfully begged Pope Zephyrinus to receive him into communion.

Novatian (d. 258), another third-century figure, certainly claimed the See of Rome in opposition to Pope Cornelius, and if Natalius and Hippolytus were excluded because of the uncertainties concerning them, Novatian could then be said to be the first antipope.

The period in which antipopes were most numerous was during the struggles between the popes and the Holy Roman Emperors of the 11th and 12th centuries. The emperors frequently imposed their own nominees to further their own causes. The popes, likewise, sometimes sponsored rival imperial claimants (anti-kings) in Germany to overcome a particular emperor.

The Western Schism – which began in 1378, when the French cardinals, claiming that the election of Pope Urban VI was invalid, elected antipope Clement VII as a rival to the Roman Pope – led eventually to two competing lines of antipopes: the Avignon line as Clement VII moved back to Avignon, and the Pisan line. The Pisan line, which began in 1409, was named after the town of Pisa, Italy, where the (Pisan) council had elected antipope Alexander V as a third claimant. To end the schism, in May 1415, the Council of Constance deposed antipope John XXIII of the Pisan line. Pope Gregory XII of the Roman line resigned in July 1415. In 1417, the council also formally deposed antipope Benedict XIII of Avignon, but he adamantly refused to resign. Afterwards, Pope Martin V was elected and was accepted everywhere except in the small and rapidly diminishing area of influence of Benedict XIII.

== Historical antipopes ==
The following table gives the names of the antipopes included in the list of popes and antipopes in the Annuario Pontificio, with the addition of the names of Natalius (in spite of doubts about his historicity) and antipope Clement VIII (whose following was insignificant).

An asterisk marks those who were included in the conventional numbering of later popes who took the same name. More commonly, the antipope is ignored in later papal regnal numbers; for example, there was an antipope John XXIII, but the Pope John elected in 1958 is also called John XXIII. For the additional confusion regarding popes named John, see Pope John numbering.

The list of popes and antipopes in the Annuario Pontificio attaches the following note to the name of Pope Leo VIII (963–965):

At this point, as again in the mid-11th century, we come across elections in which problems of harmonising historical criteria and those of theology and canon law make it impossible to decide clearly which side possessed the legitimacy whose factual existence guarantees the unbroken lawful succession of the successors of Saint Peter. The uncertainty that in some cases results has made it advisable to abandon the assignation of successive numbers in the list of the popes.

Thus, because of the obscurities about mid-11th-century canon law and the historical facts, the Annuario Pontificio lists Sylvester III as a pope, without thereby expressing a judgement on his legitimacy. The Catholic Encyclopedia places him in its List of Popes, but with the annotation: "Considered by some to be an antipope". Other sources classify him as an antipope.

As Celestine II resigned before being consecrated and enthroned in order to avoid a schism, Oxford's A Dictionary of Popes (2010) considers he "... is classified, unfairly, as an antipope", an opinion historian Salvador Miranda also shares.

Those with asterisks (*) were counted in subsequent papal numbering.

Pontificate	Common English name	Regnal (Latin) name	Personal name	Place of birth	Age at election/resignation or death	Time as antipope (days)	Notes	In opposition to
c. 199 – c. 200	Natalius	Natalius	Natalius	c. 159 Rome, Roman Empire	38 / 48	1 year, 0 days (365)	Later reconciled (see above)	Zephyrinus
20 Dec 217 – 28 Sep 235	Saint Hippolytus	Hippolytus	Hippolytus	170 Rome, Roman Empire	45 / 65 (†66)	17 years, 282 days (6491)	Later reconciled with Pope Pontian (see above)	Callixtus I
20 Dec 217 – 28 Sep 235	Saint Hippolytus	Hippolytus	Hippolytus	170 Rome, Roman Empire	45 / 65 (†66)	17 years, 282 days (6491)	Later reconciled with Pope Pontian (see above)	Urban I
20 Dec 217 – 28 Sep 235	Saint Hippolytus	Hippolytus	Hippolytus	170 Rome, Roman Empire	45 / 65 (†66)	17 years, 282 days (6491)	Later reconciled with Pope Pontian (see above)	Pontian
Mar 251 – Aug 258	Novatian	Novatianus	Novatian	c. 200 Rome, Roman Empire	51 / 58 (†93)	7 years, 153 days (2710)	Founder of Novatianism	Cornelius
Mar 251 – Aug 258	Novatian	Novatianus	Novatian	c. 200 Rome, Roman Empire	51 / 58 (†93)	7 years, 153 days (2710)	Founder of Novatianism	Lucius I
Mar 251 – Aug 258	Novatian	Novatianus	Novatian	c. 200 Rome, Roman Empire	51 / 58 (†93)	7 years, 153 days (2710)	Founder of Novatianism	Stephen I
Mar 251 – Aug 258	Novatian	Novatianus	Novatian	c. 200 Rome, Roman Empire	51 / 58 (†93)	7 years, 153 days (2710)	Founder of Novatianism	Sixtus II
20 Apr 309 – 16 Aug 310	Heraclius	Heraclius	Heraclius	c. 265 Rome, Roman Empire	45 / 46	1 year, 118 days (483)		Eusebius
355 – 26 Nov 365	Felix II*	Felix secundus	Felix	c. 270 Rome, Roman Empire	80 / 90	10 years, 329 days (3982)	Installed by Roman Emperor Constantius II	Liberius
1 Oct 366 – 16 Nov 367	Ursicinus	Ursicinus	Ursinus	c. 300 Rome, Roman Empire	66 / 67	1 year, 46 days (411)		Damasus I
27 Dec 418 – 3 Apr 419	Eulalius	Eulalius	Eulalius	c. 370 Rome, Roman Empire	38 / 39 (†42)	97 days		Boniface I
22 Nov 498 – Aug 506/08	Laurentius	Laurentius	Lorenzo Celio	c. 460 Rome, Roman Empire	38 / 46 (†48)	9 years, 283 days (3569)	Supported by Byzantine emperor Anastasius I	Symmachus
22 Sep 530 – 14 Oct 530	Dioscorus	Dioscurus	Dióskoros	c. 450 Alexandria	70 / 70	22 days		Boniface II
16 Jun 687 – 21 Sep 687	Theodore	Theodorus	Theodore	c. 599 Rome, Duchy of Rome	88 / 88 (†92)	97 days		Sergius I
21 Sep 687 – 27 Dec 687	Paschal (I)	Paschalis	Pascale	c. 598 Rome, Duchy of Rome	89 / 89 (†94)	97 days		Sergius I
28 Jun 767 – 6 Aug 768	Constantine II	Constantinus secundus	Konstantinus	c. 700 Rome, Duchy of Rome	67 / 68 (†69)	1 year, 39 days (405)		Between Paul I and Stephen III
31 Jul 768	Philip	Philippus	Philip	c. 701 Rome, Duchy of Rome	68 / 68 (†99)	0 days	Installed by envoy of Lombard King Desiderius	Stephen III
25 Jan – 31 May 844	John VIII	Joannes octavus	Giovanni	c. 800 Rome, Papal States	44 / 44 (†91)	151 days	Elected by acclamation	Sergius II
Jan 855 – 31 Mar 855	Anastasius III Bibliothecarius	Anastasius tertius	Anastasius	c. 810 Rome, Papal States	45 / 45 (†68)	89 days		Benedict III
3 Oct 903 – 27 Jan 904	Christopher	Christophorus	Christoforo	c. 850 Rome, Papal States	53 / 54	116 days		Between Leo V and Sergius III
6 December 963 – 26 February 964	Leo VIII*	Leo octavus	Leone	c. 915 Rome, Papal States	48 / 49	82 days	Installed by emperor Otto the Great, opposed to John XII, later succeeded Benedict V as a legitimate Pope	John XII
Jul 974	Boniface VII*	Bonifacius	Franco Ferrucci	c. 900 Rome, Papal States	73 / 73 and 84 / 85	30 days and 334 days (364 total)		Between Benedict VI and Benedict VII
20 Aug 984 – 20 Jul 985	Boniface VII*	Bonifacius	Franco Ferrucci	c. 900 Rome, Papal States	73 / 73 and 84 / 85	30 days and 334 days (364 total)		Between John XIV and John XV
Apr 997 – Feb 998	John XVI*	Joannes	John Filagatto	c. 941 Rossano, Calabria, Papal States (Italy)	56 / 56 (†59)	1 year, 0 days (365)	Supported by Byzantine emperor Basil II	Gregory V
Jun 1012	Gregory VI	Gregorius Sextus	Gregorio	c. 960 Rome, Papal States	52 / 52 (†60)	29 days		Benedict VIII
4 Apr 1058 – 24 Jan 1059	Benedict X*	Benedictus Decimus	Giovanni Mincio dei Conti di Tusculo	c. 1000 Rome, Papal States,	58 / 59 (†80)	295 days	Supported by the Counts of Tusculum	Nicholas II
July 1061 – 31 May 1064	Honorius II	Honorius Secundus	Pietro Cadalus	1010 Verona, Papal States	51 / 54 (†62)	2 years, 335 days (1065)	Supported by Agnes, regent of the Holy Roman Empire	Alexander II
25 Jun 1080, 21 Mar 1084 – 8 Sep 1100	Clement III	Clemens Tertius	Guibert of Ravenna	c. 1029 Parma, Papal States	51 / 51, 54 / 71	20 years, 44 days (7348)	Supported by Henry IV, Holy Roman Emperor	Gregory VII
25 Jun 1080, 21 Mar 1084 – 8 Sep 1100	Clement III	Clemens Tertius	Guibert of Ravenna	c. 1029 Parma, Papal States	51 / 51, 54 / 71	20 years, 44 days (7348)	Supported by Henry IV, Holy Roman Emperor	Victor III
25 Jun 1080, 21 Mar 1084 – 8 Sep 1100	Clement III	Clemens Tertius	Guibert of Ravenna	c. 1029 Parma, Papal States	51 / 51, 54 / 71	20 years, 44 days (7348)	Supported by Henry IV, Holy Roman Emperor	Urban II
25 Jun 1080, 21 Mar 1084 – 8 Sep 1100	Clement III	Clemens Tertius	Guibert of Ravenna	c. 1029 Parma, Papal States	51 / 51, 54 / 71	20 years, 44 days (7348)	Supported by Henry IV, Holy Roman Emperor	Paschal II
8 Sep 1100 – Jan 1101	Theodoric	Theodoricus	Theodoro	c. 1030 Rome, Papal States,	70 / 71 (†72)	121 days	Successor to Clement III	Paschal II
Jan 1101 – Feb 1102	Adalbert or Albert	Adalbertus	Albert	c. 1046 Atella, Campania, Papal States,	55 / 56 (†85)	31 days	Successor to Theodoric	Paschal II
8 Nov 1105 – 11 Apr 1111	Sylvester IV	Sylvester Quartus	Maginulf	c. 1050 Rome, Papal States	49 / 55 (†56)	5 years, 324 days (2150)	Supported by Henry V, Holy Roman Emperor	Paschal II
10 Mar 1118 – 22 Apr 1121	Gregory VIII	Gregorius Octavus	Maurice Burdain	c. 1057 Limousin, Occitania, France	61 / 65 (†72)	3 years, 43 days (1139)	Supported by Henry V, Holy Roman Emperor	Gelasius II
10 Mar 1118 – 22 Apr 1121	Gregory VIII	Gregorius Octavus	Maurice Burdain	c. 1057 Limousin, Occitania, France	61 / 65 (†72)	3 years, 43 days (1139)	Supported by Henry V, Holy Roman Emperor	Callixtus II
16 Dec 1124	Celestine II	Cœlestinus Secundus	Teobaldo Boccapecci	c. 1050 Rome, Papal States	74 / 74 (†86)	0 days		Honorius II
14 Feb 1130 – 25 Jan 1138	Anacletus II	Anacletus Secundus	Pietro Pierleoni	c. 1090 Rome, Papal States	48 / 48	7 years, 345 days (2902)		Innocent II
25 Jan 1138 – 28 Mar 1138	Victor IV	Victor Quartus	Gregorio Conti	c. 1057 Ceccano, Papal States	81 / 81 (†90)	63 days	Successor to Anacletus II	Innocent II
7 Sep 1159 – 20 Apr 1164	Victor IV	Victor Quartus	Ottavio di Montecelio	c. 1095 Tivoli, Papal States	64 / 69	4 years, 226 days (1687)	Supported by Frederick I, Holy Roman Emperor	Alexander III
22 Apr 1164 – 28 Sep 1168	Paschal III	Paschalis Tertius	Guido di Crema	c. 1110 Crema, Lombardy, Papal States	54 / 58	4 years, 159 days (1620)	Supported by Frederick I, Holy Roman Emperor	Alexander III
Sep 1168 – 29 Aug 1178	Callixtus III	Callixtus Tertius	Giovanni of Struma	c. 1090 Arezzo, Papal States	78 / 88 (†90)	9 years, 362 days (3649)	Supported by Frederick I, Holy Roman Emperor	Alexander III
29 Sep 1179 – Jan 1180	Innocent III	Innocentius Tertius	Lanzo of Sezza	c. 1120 Sezze, Papal States	59 / 60 (†63)	95 days	Supported by Frederick I, Holy Roman Emperor	Alexander III
12 May 1328 – 12 Aug 1330	Nicholas V	Nicolaus Quintus	Pietro Rainalducci	c. 1258 Corvaro, Papal States	70 / 74	2 years, 92 days (822)	Supported by Louis IV, Holy Roman Emperor	John XXII
20 Sep 1378 – 16 Sep 1394	Clement VII	Clemens	Robert of Geneva	1342 Annecy, France	36 / 52	15 years, 361 days (5840)	Avignon	Urban VI
20 Sep 1378 – 16 Sep 1394	Clement VII	Clemens	Robert of Geneva	1342 Annecy, France	36 / 52	15 years, 361 days (5840)	Avignon	Boniface IX
28 Sep 1394 – 23 May 1423	Benedict XIII	Benedictus	Pedro de Luna	25 November 1328 Illueca, Aragon	65 / 94	28 years, 237 days (10,463)	Avignon	Boniface IX
28 Sep 1394 – 23 May 1423	Benedict XIII	Benedictus	Pedro de Luna	25 November 1328 Illueca, Aragon	65 / 94	28 years, 237 days (10,463)	Avignon	Innocent VII
28 Sep 1394 – 23 May 1423	Benedict XIII	Benedictus	Pedro de Luna	25 November 1328 Illueca, Aragon	65 / 94	28 years, 237 days (10,463)	Avignon	Gregory XII
28 Sep 1394 – 23 May 1423	Benedict XIII	Benedictus	Pedro de Luna	25 November 1328 Illueca, Aragon	65 / 94	28 years, 237 days (10,463)	Avignon	Martin V
25 Jun 1409 – 3 May 1410	Alexander V*	Alexander	Pietro Philarghi	c. 1339 Crete, Republic of Venice	70 / 71	312 days (312)	Pisa	Gregory XII
25 May 1410 – 29 May 1415	John XXIII	Ioannes Vicecimus Tertius	Baldassare Cossa	c. 1365	45 / 50 (†54)	5 years, 6 days (1832)	Pisa	Gregory XII
10 Jun 1423 – 26 Jul 1429	Clement VIII	Clemens Octavus	Gil Sánchez Muñoz y Carbón	1370 Teruel, Aragon	52 / 59 (†77)	6 years, 49 days (2241)	Avignon	Martin V
1424–1430	Benedict XIV	Benedictus Quartus Decimus	Bernard Garnier	1370 France	54 / 59 (†89)	6 years, 211 days (2403)	Claimed successor to Benedict XIII – aka the hidden pope	Martin V
1430–1437	Benedict XIV	Benedictus Quartus Decimus	Jean Carrier	c. 1370 France	59 / 66	7 years, 242 days (2799)		Martin V
5 Nov 1439 – 7 Apr 1449	Felix V	Fœlix	Duke Amadeus VIII of Savoy	4 September 1383 Chambéry, Savoy	56 / 65 (†67)	9 years, 153 days (3441)	Elected by the Council of Basel	Eugene IV
5 Nov 1439 – 7 Apr 1449	Felix V	Fœlix	Duke Amadeus VIII of Savoy	4 September 1383 Chambéry, Savoy	56 / 65 (†67)	9 years, 153 days (3441)	Elected by the Council of Basel	Nicholas V

=== Pseudocardinals ===
Many antipopes elected individuals to the cardinalate, particularly during the Western Schism. These pseudocardinals (and in some cases, pseudobishops) were not recognised by the Catholic Church, although during the Western Schism it was sometimes difficult to tell which cardinals were validly elected and which were not, much as there was confusion between who was the legitimate pope and who was an antipope. Not helping matters, some cardinals and bishops switched their allegiances after being elected. Furthermore, following the tradition of popes elevating their nephews to the cardinalate, people who became known as cardinal-nephews, some antipopes elevevated their own nephews to the cardinalate, becoming pseudocardinal-nephews.

==== Pseudocardinal-nephews ====
Quasi-cardinal	Nephew of	Elevated	Notes
Giacomo Alberti	Antipope Nicholas V	15 May 1328	Excommunicated by Pope John XXII.
Amedeo Saluzzo	Antipope Clement VII	23 Dec 1383	Abandoned antipope Benedict XIII after having been deposed by him on 21 October 1408; participated in the Council of Pisa, the election of Pope Alexander V (now regarded as an antipope), the Council of Constance, and the conclave of Pope Martin V.
Tommaso Brancaccio	Antipope John XXIII	6 Jun 1411	Attended the Council of Constance, and the conclave of Pope Martin V.; he was a legitimate bishop within the Church.
Gil Sánchez Muñoz	Antipope Clement VIII	26 Jul 1429	Submitted to Pope Martin V after his uncle abdicated.

== Alternative popes ==
The concept of the antipope has continued into the modern day, with most recent claimants being adherents to the Sedevacantist movement, a loose collection of traditionalist Catholics who consider the more liberal decisions made during the 1962–1965 Second Vatican Council to be heretical, rendering all subsequent popes illegitimate. However, the term antipope is rarely used in reference to these modern pretenders, likely due to their small followings and lack of influence in the mainstream Roman Catholic Church. Professor Magnus Lundberg of the University of Uppsala coined the term alternative popes to refer to these modern minor popes.

Modern alternative popes include:

Lay name	Papal name	Time as antipope	Associated church	Notes
Michel Collin	Clement XV	1950–1974	Apostles of Infinite Love	In 1950, Collin declared that he had received a vision that God had crowned him Pope, and took the name Clement XV. Despite technically existing in opposition to Pius XII and John XXIII he supported their papacies, but believed they were being suppressed by the Roman Curia and only openly opposed Paul VI.
Michel Lavallée, also known as Fr. Mathurin de la Mère de Dieu	Gregory XVIII	January 2012–present	Apostles of Infinite Love	The chosen successor of Michel Collin after Jean-Gaston Tremblay split from the Apostles of Infinite Love.
Jean-Gaston Tremblay	Gregory XVII (French: Grégoire XVII) also known as John-Gregory XVII (Jean-Grégoire XVII)	May 1969 – 31 December 2011	Apostles of Infinite Love (formerly); Canadian Apostles of Infinite Love	Initially a follower of Michel Collin (Clement XV) and Collin's designated successor, he split with the Apostles of Infinite Love in 1968 and declared himself Pope. According to him, God had not given him the title of Pope, but rather "Shepherd of the Church".
Giuseppe Zani	Rabbi or Rabi	1974–present	Independent	The leader of a religious group located in Brescia which spiritually recognises Michel Collins as Clement XV, but is otherwise not connected to the Apostles of Infinite Love.
Timothy Joseph Blasio Atila	n/a (Note: The Legio Maria popes do not assume papal names but rather place Pope at the beginning of their full name, i.e.: Raphael Titus Otieno would be Pope Raphael Titus Otieno, however sometimes this is shortened for convenience, i.e.: Pope Otieno.)	1964–1998	Legio Maria	The first Pope of the Legio Maria following the death of Simeo Ondeto. (Note: Simeon Ondeto is sometimes considered as the first Pope of the Legio Maria, but the group themselves refer to Ondeto as the Messiah, not a Pope.)
Maria Pius Lawrence Jairo Chiaji Adera	n/a	1998–2004	Legio Maria	The second Pope of the Legio Maria.
Raphael Titus Otieno	n/a	2004–present	Legio Maria	The third Pope of the Legio Maria. His Papacy has been disputed by Romanus On'gombe since 2010.
Romanus Alphonsus On'gombe	n/a	2010–present	Legio Maria	A pope in opposition to Otieno, whose papacy he disputes. This has caused the Legio Maria to have two popes, whose supporters violently clash with each other.
Clemente Domínguez y Gómez, also known as Fernando María de la Santa Faz	Gregory XVII	1978–2005	Palmarian Catholic Church	An alleged seer, visionary, and mystic. Following the death of Paul VI, he founded the Palmarian Catholic Church and declared himself the 263rd pope in opposition to John Paul I and later John Paul II.
Manuel Alonso Corral, also known as Isidoro María de la Santa Faz	Peter II	March 2005 – July 2011	Palmarian Catholic Church	The second pope of the Palmarian Catholic Church and claimed to be the 264th pope in opposition to John Paul II and Benedict XVI.
Ginés Jesús Hernández y Martínez, also known as Sergio María de la Santa Faz	Gregory XVIII	July 2011 – April 2016	Palmarian Catholic Church	The third Pope of the Palmarian church and claimed to be the 265th pope in opposition to Benedict XVI and Pope Francis. In April 2016, he abdicated and left the church, then reconciled with the Vatican.
Markus Josef Odermatt, also known as Eliseo María de la Santa Faz	Peter III	April 2016–present	Palmarian Catholic Church	The fourth Pope of the Palmarian church and claimed to be the 266th pope in opposition to Pope Francis and Leo XIV.
Gino Frediani	Immanuel I	1974–1984	New Universal Church of the Sacred Heart of Jesus	He claimed to receive a vision from the Prophet Habakkuk to build a Holy Church to the Sacred Heart of Jesus. He is the only Pope of the church, as his followers believe that he will return from Heaven to save them.
Chester Olszewski	Chriszekiel Elias; Christen Elias; Peter II	31 May 1977–?	Holy Family Catholic Church	An Episcopalian priest from the United States, he became obsessed with a bleeding statue owned by a woman called Anne Poore, and believed it was his mission to restore Catholicism, declaring himself Pope and founding the Holy Family Catholic Church alongside some friends.
Francis Konrad Schuckardt	Hadrian VII	Unclear, post-1962	Congregation of Mary Immaculate Queen	A sedevacantist, he was one of the most well-known opponents of Vatican II and founded the Congregation of Mary Immaculate Queen. Although never publicly declaring himself as an antipope, an authorised biography by a member of the church refers to him as "Hadrian VII", and has an illustration of him receiving the Papal Tiara.
Aimé Baudet	Peter II; Peter Athanasius II	c. 1984–?	Palmarian Catholic Church (formerly)	Possibly an urban legend, there are reports that this individual was crowned Pope at St. Peter's Tomb in 1984.
Pierre-Henri Dubois	Peter II	n/a	Eastern Orthodox Church; Ecumenical Patriarchate of Constantinople	Erroneously reported as an antipope, he was in fact elected as Patriarch of Belgium under the name Peter IV.
Olinto Vestini, also known as Valeriano Vestini	Valerian I	1990–1995	Missionary Order for the Salvation of Souls	Previously a member of the Capuchin order, he was informed by seers that he had been elected as Pope by divine intervention. He then created the Missionary Order for the Salvation of Souls and declared himself antipope in opposition to John Paul II, but in 1995 left the mission and rejoined the Capuchins.
Maurice Archieri	Peter II (French: Pierre II)	1995–2016	Independent	Claimed to receive a vision where the Holy Ghost elected him Pope and called himself Peter II. He did not oppose the Vatican per se, but believed that the Vatican pope was the material head of a different religion and thus he was the true pope.
Julius Tischler	Peter II	c. 1998	Independent	Little is known about Julius, except that he was a German man who declared himself Pope in 1998, however Joachim Bouflet asserts that this may be the pseudonym of Franz Engelhardt, or that Julius would be the last pope to exist, being consecrated in 1998, based on a claim made in 1972.
Thsung Zhong Huai-de, also known as Robert Chung	Pius XIV	1999–2002	Independent (Traditionalist)	He claimed to have been elected as Pope in Taipei in a 1999 conclave with 75 traditionalist clergy present.
Reinaldus Michael Benjamins, also known as Brother Raymond of the Trinity	Gregory XIX	2001–c. 2005	Independent	A clergyman from Malone, New York, he declared himself Pope in 2001 and was active until at least 2005.
Mathias Vigan	Christopher XVIII (Christophe XVIII)	2012–present	The Most Holy Church of Jesus Christ, Banamè Mission (French: La Très Sainte Église de Jésus-Christ, Mission de Banamè)	Previously a Catholic priest, during an exorcism of a woman called Vicentia Tchranvoukinni she convinced him of a mission to "renew" the Catholic Church. When the pair were declared heretics and apostates in 2011, Vicentia crowned Vigan as Pope.
William Kamm, also known as The Little Pebble	Peter II	The future	Order of Saint Charbel	Kamm and his followers do not directly oppose the Vatican, instead they believe that Kamm will eventually succeed the Pope as the prophesised Peter II, and lead the Papacy during the apocalypse.
David Bawden	Michael I	July 1990 – August 2022	The Vatican in Exile	A leader of the conclavism movement, Bawden was elected Pope during a conclave in 1990 composed of his friends and family and subsequently established the Vatican in Exile, ordaining bishops and other clergymen.
Rogelio del Rosario Martinez Jr.	Michael II	August 2023–present	The Vatican in Exile	The second conclavist antipope after Bawden, Martinez was elected in a conclave held in Vienna.
Victor Von Pentz	Linus II	June 1994 – 2021	Independent (Sedevacantist)	An antipope elected at a sedevacantist papal election in Assisi who believed that the popes elected following Vatican II were heretics.
Lucian Pulvermacher	Pius XIII; Peter II	October 1998 – 2009	Catholic Church (Note: Strictly speaking, the Catholic Church considers itself to be the same as the Catholic Church, and emphasise that the "the" in "the Catholic Church" should remain uncapitalized.) (Sedevacantist)	A former Capuchin elected in a small layman conclave in Montana, Pulvermacher became the head of the Catholic Church in exile. Following his death, the process of electing a new pope began, but as of 2025, they have not elected one.
Joaquín Llorens Grau	Alexander IX	2005–present	Congregación Mercedaria Sagrada Tradición Nuestra Señora de la Merced, Generala de los Ejércitos Celestiales, Corredentora	A part of the traditionalist missionary Congregación founded by Antonio Velasco, Grau was elected as Pope in the group's first conclave and opposes Pope Francis and Leo XIV.
Oscar Michaelli	Leo XIV	2006–2008	The Catholic Apostolic Remnant Church	Supposedly three Argentinian priests that believed in sedevacantism and were elected as subsequent popes, the church is regarded as a hoax since it has never been able to prove its existence beyond a webpage.
Juan Bautista Bonetti	Innocent XIV	March–May 2008	The Catholic Apostolic Remnant Church	Supposedly three Argentinian priests that believed in sedevacantism and were elected as subsequent popes, the church is regarded as a hoax since it has never been able to prove its existence beyond a webpage.
Alejandro Greico	Alexander IX	24 May 2008 – present	The Catholic Apostolic Remnant Church	Supposedly three Argentinian priests that believed in sedevacantism and were elected as subsequent popes, the church is regarded as a hoax since it has never been able to prove its existence beyond a webpage.
Bryan Richard Clayton	Athanasius I	2011–? (possibly 2012)	Hasidean Catholic Church	A travelling exorcist, he held the belief that all popes after Leo XIII were antipopes, since Pius X reformed the Roman Breviary. He held a conclave to elect himself as Pope Athanasius and founded the Hasidean Catholic Church, however some of his followers believe he excommunicated himself in 2012 when he changed the words he used in his Mass from Latin ones to Hebrew ones.
Douglas Kuzell	Petrus Romanus (Peter II)	c. 2010–present	Faithful Remnant	Kuzell and his wife Teresa Jackson believe themselves to be the last two witnesses mentioned in the Book of Revelation, and additionally that Douglas is the last Pope, Petrus Romanus, mentioned in a prophecy about the Bible.
Antonio José Hurtado	Peter II (Spanish: Pedro II)	1939–1955	Independent	A self-trained Colombian dentist, Hurtado believed he would be the pope to succeed Pius XI. After being mocked for his belief following Pius' death and rejected by the Vatican, he declared himself the antipope and established a journal, El Emmanuel, to spread his beliefs. He never gained much of a following outside his hometown of Barbosa and was buried as a Roman Catholic.
Ubaldo Rolón	Pedro Segundo (Spanish for 'Peter II')	2007–2016	The Church of Jesus	A "transcendent peronist" and member of the Iron Guard, he received visions that he was "Peter, the Prince of the Apostles" and the last pope. He subsequently declared himself Pedro Segundo and began to spread his teachings in a movement called The Church of Jesus until he died in 2016.
Giuseppe Maria Abbate	n/a (Note: Abbate did not have a papal name, but rather used a variety of titles for himself including: Celestial Messenger (Italian: Messaggero Celeste), Celestial Father (Padre Celeste), Universal Protector, St. Michael the Archangel, the Prince of Peace, God's Vicar on Earth, and the Celestial King.)	1917–1963	New Jerusalem Catholic Church	An Italian-American immigrant who ran a barbershop, Abbate believed he was divinely ordained to be the "Celestial Messenger" when he had a vision of Jesus walking into his barbershop, ordaining him as a priest, and telling him to found a new church. Abbate did so, and directly opposed the Catholic Church and the Pope.
Adam Anthony Oraczewski	Adam II	1927–1973	Independent	A suspended Roman Catholic priest, in 1927 Oraczewski published All in One True Faith, which depicted him wearing papal robes, declared that he was Pope Adam II, and proposed a radical ecclesiastical reform that he believed would bring greater piety and human unity. He continued calling himself Adam II until his death in 1973.
Franz Engelhardt, also known as Ferenc Egerszégi and possibly as Julius Tischler	Peter II	Future	Independent	He claimed to be mystically present at Fatimah during the Marian apparitions that happened in 1917, and that he was the "fourth seer" who had received a message about the Apocalypse. He therefore claimed that he was the future Peter II, however when he was arrested by the Bundesgrenzschutz and sentenced for the sexual abuse of minors, his followers disappeared.
Ján Maria Michał Kowalski	n/a	n/a	Catholic Mariavite Church	Although he never made the claim himself, his supporters saw him as the Slavic Pope that Polish nationalist authors wrote about and subsequently viewed Popes Benedict XV and Pius XI as illegitimate.
Mario Samuele Morcia	Supreme Pontiff Samuele	2015–present	The Universal Christian Church of the New Jerusalem	Elected as Supreme Pontiff following the establishment of the Universal Church, Samuele had opposed Pope Francis, seeing him as illegitimate.
Eduardo Dávila Garza	Eduardo I	1933–1985	Iglesia Católica Apostolica Mexicana	Born into the Iglesia Católica Apostolica Mexicana, Eduardo rose through the ranks until he succeeded Patriarch José Joquín Pérez Budar, where he subsequently assumed the title of Pope and Supreme Pontiff of Mexico and the Americas. His church got into conflicts with the Roman Catholic Church in Mexico, however after his death in 1985 the support for his movement dwindled and no-one was ever elected as his successor.
Tsietsi Daniel Makiti	n/a	2017–present	Gabola Church	Formerly a priest of the Old Apostolic Church, he left that church after having a spiritual revelation to found a new church where individuals worship through the consumption of alcoholic beverages. The Catholic Church has declared Makiti to be a heretic.
Philbert London	Emmanuel	?–2024	Beacon Ministries and the House of Majesty	A televangelist, he declared himself to be Pope Emmanuel and the true voice of God.
Valdir Ros	Pedro II	1985–1994	Instituto Estrela Missionária	Considered to be mentally ill by Bishop Adriano Hypólito of the Diocese of Nova Iguaçu, Ros formed his own mission in his house and began to host ever more charismatic sermons. When he was confronted by Bishop Adriano for preaching whilst not being ordained, he publicly declared that all popes from John XXIII to John Paul II were heretics and renounced Vatican II, declaring himself as Pope Pedro II. He continued to claim the papacy up until his death in 1994, when his followers mostly dispersed.
Abdullah Hashem Aba al-Sadiq (Arabic: عبدالله هاشم أبا الصادق)	n/a	2025-present	Ahmadi Religion of Peace and Light	In a YouTube video to his followers entitled "A Special Message to the Christians Around the World" he claimed that all subsequent Popes after Saint Peter were illegitimate, as they had not been selected by Jesus personally. He then went on to declare himself as the only legitimate Pope, as well as stating he was the successor to Jesus, Saint Peter, Muhammad, Muhammad al-Mahdi, and Ahmed al-Hasan.
Gary Michael McLaughlin	n/a (Note: Due to believing he would be the Pope in the future, he never took a Papal name, however he used many titles and aliases for himself, such as Father Jean Claude Joseph, Father Peter, Brother Michael O’Connell, and Father X.)	Future	Independent (Traditionalist Catholicism)	Beginning in the 1980s, McLaughlin became associated with various officially condemned Marian shrines in North America, initially within in the town of Necedah, Wisconsin, but eventually in Orrin, North Dakota. He claimed to have received a vision to found two religious orders, the Franciscan Penitents of the Virgin Mary, for men, and the Poor Clares of Reparation. He also claimed to be ordained as a Bishop by Francis DiBenedetto, a Bishop of the Old Catholic Church, however he clashed with DiBenedetto and was later excommunicated by him, and his ordination was invalidated by the Bishop of Fargo. In 1987 he was arrested for Mail and wire fraud. He continued operating during the 1990s, during which he published a prophecy which identified him as the future Pope, though after this his followers started to reduce in number. He died in 2023 having never formally declared himself Pope.
Jean-Pierre Mastropietro	Pope Jean-Pierre (English: John-Peter)	2007-present	Community of the Lady of All Nations	In 2007, Mastropietro was excommunicated from the Catholic Church for ordaining priests whilst not being a Bishop. Subsequently he declared himself to be Pope Jean-Pierre, claiming that the Catholic Church was in decline and the Community of the Lady of All Nations was the only true alternative. In his capacity as Pope he canonised people and defined Dogmas, attempted to redefine the Trinity into a "quinternity" that included Mary and the sect's founder Marie-Paule Giguère, and crowned Marc Bosquart, another religious leader, as King Marc-André I. In 2022 a rift between Mastropietro and Bosquart grew, with Mastropietro eventually losing much influence and authority within his church.

== Antipopes of Alexandria ==
The Patriarch of Alexandria, the historical center of Christianity in Egypt since the Roman Empire, has historically also held the title of pope, and as a result, a person who claims that title in direct opposition to a generally accepted pope of Alexandria may be considered an antipope. The title is simultaneously claimed by the Coptic Orthodox Church, the Greek Orthodox Church of Alexandria, the Coptic Catholic Church, and the Melkite Catholic Church (the latter two, while being in full communion with Rome, still maintain the position of Patriarch of Alexandria as a significant church leader).

In the modern day, with the rise of ecumenism and the recognition of Christianity's complicated history, these four men typically do not view one another as antipopes, but rather as successors to different lines of apostolic succession resulting from theological disputes in the fifth century. However, there have been certain instances where the official declaration of an antipope has been deemed necessary. For example, in 2006 former lector of the Coptic Orthodox Church Max Michel, who had previously formed the independent St. Athanasius Church, declared himself Archbishop of Egypt and the Middle East under the name Maximus I, effectively becoming an antipope of Alexandria. His claims to the Alexandrian papacy were formally dismissed in a joint statement by both the Coptic Orthodox Pope Shenouda III and Pope Theodore II of the Greek Orthodox Church of Alexandria.

== Antipopes in other Churches ==
The term antipope can be used with a schismatic leader in any of Churches which have apostolic succession. However some scholars are less willing to refer to such pretenders as antipopes, as the term has historically been used in reference to those who claim to be the bishop of Rome, the apostolic successors to Saint Peter.

=== Patriarch of Cilicia ===
During the schism that happened in the Armenian Catholic Church during 1873, an election was held which voted Jacob Pahtiarian into the position of Patriarch of the Patriarchate of Cilicia, which was in opposition to the Pope-appointed Patriarch, Andon Bedros IX Hassoun. Pahtiarian was referred to by some as an "anti-Patriarch".

=== Patriarch of Armenia ===
John of Bagaran (Yovhannes, or Hovhannes Bagaranc‘i) (in Armenian Հովհաննես Բագարանցի ; died in 611) was installed by the Byzantines in opposition to Catholicos Moses III and Abraham I from 609 to 611. He is usually referred to as anti-Catholicos, and does not appear in the canonical lists of the cathoclioi of the Armenian Apostolic Church.

== Papal conspiracy theories ==
Some sedevacantist conspiracy theorists consider the incumbent pope to be the antipope, as for various reasons they believe the incumbent pope is illegitimate. For supporters of the Giuseppe Siri conspiracy theory, which holds that white smoke seen on the first day of the conclave was announcing the selection of Giuseppe Siri as Pope Gregory XVII until he was forced to stand down, the pope that was elected in Siri's place, John XXIII, was an antipope as Siri was still the lawfully-elected pope. Similarly, for supports of Benevacantism, the belief that Pope Benedict XVI did not validly resign, Pope Francis would be considered an antipope. A similar fringe theory, Catholic survivantism states that Pope Paul VI (born 1897) is still alive, and thus all successive popes are antipopes. Believers of this theory also believe that the Paul VI that died in 1978 was an actor, and the real Paul VI is being held in prison.

For conclavists, the argument that the current pope is illegitimate or an antipope (either wholly or sedeprivationally) is important as it lends their own claims and conclaves legitimacy. The most common conclavist claim is that Pius XII was the last true pope, and that all subsequent popes are antipopes. Some place the date even earlier, with the papacy ending with John XXIII. All these claims center around the reforms of Vatican II or the publication of the revised Roman Rite.

== In fiction ==
Antipopes have appeared as fictional characters. These may be either in historical fiction, as fictional portraits of well-known historical antipopes or as purely imaginary antipopes.

- Jean Raspail's novel l'Anneau du pêcheur ("The Fisherman's Ring").
- Gérard Bavoux's novel Le Porteur de lumière ("The Light-bringer").
- The fictional synth-pop artist Zladko Vladcik claims to be "The Anti-Pope" in one of his songs.
- Dan Simmons's novels Endymion and The Rise of Endymion feature the character of Father Paul Duré, who becomes Pope Teilhard I, but a few years later he is deposed and murdered by a secret group of high-ranking cardinals who disagree with his policies. They install a more tractable successor, and Duré is subsequently referred to by church leadership as the antipope. At the end of the last novel, it is mentioned that another person calling himself the pope of the Technocore loyal Catholics is recognized by very few even among that group, and he is also referred to as an antipope.
- In the Girl Genius comics series, set in a gaslamp fantasy version of Europe thrown into chaos by mad science (among other things), there is a brief reference to the existence of seven popes—all of whom apparently ordered a particular text burned.
- Ralph McInerny's novel The Red Hat features a schism between liberals and conservatives following the election of a conservative African Pope; the liberal faction elect an Italian cardinal who calls himself "Pius XIII".
- In the video game Crusader Kings II by Swedish developer Paradox Interactive, Catholic rulers may appoint one of their bishops as an antipope. An emperor-tier ruler such as the Holy Roman Emperor may declare war on the Papal States to install their antipope as the true pope, thereby vassalizing the papacy.
- With the release of the By God Alone DLC for Crusader Kings III, the player is able to play as theocratic rulers, including the Pope, Bishops, and Archbishops. Playing as any kind of bishop allows the player to eventually declare themselves as antipope and usurp the Papacy, if they wish.
- In the video game Age of Empires II, the third scenario in the game's Barbarossa campaign is called "Pope and Antipope" and is based on the Siege of Crema and the subsequent Wars of the Guelphs and Ghibellines.
- In episode 3 of The Black Adder (set in the late 15th century), "The Archbishop", Baldrick remarks on selling counterfeit papal pardons, that one for the highest crimes requires the signatures of "both popes" (implying one pope and one antipope). At the end of the episode, the Mother Superior of the local convent informs Edmund that he has been excommunicated by "all three popes".
- The Last Fisherman by Randy England features an antipope John XXIV elected in opposition to Pope Brendan I.
- Bud McFarlane's Pierced by a Sword includes an antipope John XXIV who is elected when the assassination attempt on Pope Patrick (fictional successor to John Paul II) is believed to have succeeded. He commits suicide at the end of the book.
- Chilling Adventures of Sabrina features an antipope who leads the Churches of Darkness. This antipope reigns in the Vatican Necropolis beneath Rome.
- In the TV series The New Pope, after the fictional Pius XIII is put in a coma, Pope Francis II is elected as a replacement. Francis II later dies and is replaced by John Paul III, the titular protagonist. Pius XIII later wakes up, creating a situation where both men have a claim on the papacy.

== See also ==
- Benevacantism
- List of papal elections
- Papal conclave
- Papal selection before 1059
- Sedevacantism
- Pretender

== External links and bibliography ==
- Catholic Encyclopedia: "Antipope"
- Encyclopædia Britannica: "Antipope"
- The Pope Encyclopaedia: "Antipope"
- Kelly, J.N.D, The Oxford Dictionary of Popes, Oxford University Press, US (1986), ISBN 0192139649.
- Raspail, Jean, 'L'Anneau du pêcheur, Paris: Albin Michel, 1994. 403 pp. ISBN 2226075909.
- Bavoux, Gérard, Le Porteur de lumière, Paris: Pygmalion, 1996. 329 pp. ISBN 2857044887.
