= Antipope Benedict XIV =

Name used by two minor antipopes of the 15th century

Benedict XIV is a name used by two closely related minor antipopes of the 15th century. The first, Bernard Garnier, became antipope in 1424 and died c. 1429. The second, Jean Carrier, became antipope c. 1430 and apparently left office, whether by death or resignation, by 1437.

== 1st Benedict XIV ==
Antipope Benedict XIV (I)
- Predecessor: Antipope Benedict XIII
- Successor: Martin V (as Pope); Antipope Benedict (Jean Carrier) (as Antipope)
- Opposed to: Roman claimant: Martin V; Rival Avignon claimant: Antipope Clement VIII

Personal details
- Born: Bernard Garnier
- Died: 1429/1430 unknown

Neither of these claimants was supported by more than a very small faction within the Church. They claimed to be the successors to Benedict XIII, one of the parties to the great Papal Schism. In 1417, the Council of Constance resolved the Schism, proclaiming Martin V the new Pope and demanding that Benedict XIII renounce his claim. Benedict XIII, however, remained at a castle in Peñíscola (kingdom of Valencia) and continued to maintain supporters. He died in 1423, but, the day before his death, he created four cardinals loyal to him, in order to ensure the Avignon line. Three of these cardinals met and elected Antipope Clement VIII. However, one of Benedict XIII's cardinals, Jean Carrier, disputed the validity of this election. Carrier, acting as the College of Cardinals by himself, elected Bernard Garnier, who took the name Pope Benedict XIV, instead. Carrier was the archdeacon of Rodez, near Toulouse, and Garnier had been the sacristan of Rodez Cathedral.

Garnier conducted his office secretly and was known as the "hidden pope": a letter from the Count of Armagnac to Joan of Arc indicates that only Carrier knew Benedict XIV's location. Garnier's reign as Benedict XIV ended at his death in 1429 or 1430, although he named four of his own cardinals, one of whom was named Jean Farald.

== 2nd Benedict XIV ==
Antipope Benedict XIV (II)
- Predecessor: Martin V (pope); Antipope Benedict XIV (Bernard Garnier)
- Successor: Martin V (as Pope)
- Opposed to: Roman claimant: Martin V; Rival Avignon claimant: Antipope Clement VIII

Personal details
- Born: Jean Carrier
- Died: unknown Foix

Following Garnier's death, Jean Carrier elected himself as the new pope, and also styled himself Pope Benedict XIV. Carrier, however, had been captured and imprisoned by Antipope Clement VIII. Carrier finished his days in captivity in the castle of Foix.

== In fiction ==
Some imagine that cardinals loyal to him elected a series of increasingly marginal antipopes in 1437 and 1470. For instance, this is the scenario in the 1995 novel l'Anneau du pêcheur by the French writer Jean Raspail.

== See also ==
- Papal selection before 1059
- Papal conclave (since 1274)

== Sources ==
- Pham, John-Peter (2004). Heirs of the Fisherman: Behind the Scenes of Papal Death and Succession. Oxford University Press. ISBN 9780195346350.
- Salembier, Louis (1907). The Great Schism of the West. Keegan Paul, Trench, Trubner & Co.
- Walsh, Michael J. (2003). The Conclave: A Sometimes Secret and Occasionally Bloody History of Papal Elections. Canterbury Press. ISBN 9781461601814.
