= Apostles of Infinite Love =

Independent Catholic religious group

- Classification: Independent Catholic
- Orientation: Traditionalist Catholic
- Polity: Episcopal
- Region: France, Canada, Guadeloupe, Guatemala, the Dominican Republic, Italy, France, South Africa, United States
- Founder: Michel Collin
- Official website: https://magnificat.ca

The Order of the Magnificat of the Mother of God (French: L’Ordre du Magnificat de la Mère de Dieu), also known as the Apostles of Infinite Love (French: Apôtres de l'amour infini), is a traditionalist Independent Catholic religious group active in various parts of the world, with its headquarters being near Mont-Tremblant in Quebec. It was founded by Michel Collin, a French Catholic priest in Lille, who proclaimed himself Pope Clement XV, after claiming to have received a vision from God crowning him with a papal tiara. Initially heading a religious congregation that had Catholic archdiocesan approval, Jean-Gaston Tremblay merged his religious community with the Apostles of Infinite Love and led it for a time. The Apostles of Infinite Love has attracted traditionalist Catholics unhappy with the modernizing changes made during the Second Vatican Council.

== History ==
The Apostles of Infinite Love teach that they "were founded to preserve the traditional Catholic faith, which they thought was seriously threatened by the modernist developments in the Roman Catholic Church, where most bishops and priests had apostatized." Their centre is located at the Monastery of Magnificat of the Mother of God in St. Jovite, Quebec.

Frenchman Michel Collin (sometimes spelled Colin), born in a village of Lorraine in 1905 and ordained a priest in 1935, announced in 1936 that he had been ordained a bishop by Christ himself. He founded a community called the Order of the Mother of God (a name later changed to "Apostles of Infinite Love"), in response to the 1846 request made by the Blessed Virgin Mary, as reported later by Mélanie Calvat, one of the seers of La Salette. Throughout the 1940s, Collin and those who followed him "propagated the adoration of the Sacred Hearts of Christ and Mary" and claiming "direct orders from Christ, Collin founded a chain of foyers-cenacles, small house communities, where a consecrated host was on display at all times", stating that he was restoring "the house churches of the apostolic times". In 1950, he "reported having had a grand vision that God the Father, who put a papal tiara on his head", later embracing the name Pope Clement XV. Pope Pius XII laicized him in 1951.

In 1952, Canadian Jean-Gaston Tremblay, along with Gilles de la Croix and Leónard du Rosaire, founded near Saint-Jovite in Quebec, Canada a community under the name of the Congregation of Jesus and Mary with ecclesiastical approval from the Roman Catholic Archbishop of Montreal Paul-Émile Léger. He was previously a part of the Brothers Hospitallers of Saint John of God. Considering the religious community to be "too extreme", the archbishop's support waned and the brothers spent time searching for a permanent place to establish themselves. In 1961, he met Michel Collin and the two decided to merge their communities into one called the Apostles of Infinite Love. Gregory stated that Colin was the man he saw in a vision he purportedly had twelve years prior, which had "the face of a future pope, chosen directly by God." The following year Collin consecrated Tremblay a bishop.

After the election of Pope Paul VI in the Catholic Church, Michel Collin denounced him as an antipope. The Saint-Jovite community grew rapidly in the first years of the Second Vatican Council, exceeding 300 people in 1966. Throughout the 1960s, the Apostles of Infinite Love protested against the changes in the Catholic Church, as well as the secularisation occurring in Canada, especially issues related to "the change of gender roles" and the "increasing number of schools and hospitals [that] moved from church to government."

Since the 1960s, the Order of Magnificat of the Mother of God has accepted male and female religious, who make vows of "poverty, chastity, and obedience" and live under the Rule for the Apostles of the Latter Times, which they hold to be given by Our Lady of La Salette in 1846.

In 1967, Collin claimed that he had been divinely instructed to bypass Tremblay as his designated successor; but in 1968, Tremblay claimed that he had mystically been made Pope under the name of Gregory XVII and, in the following year, Collin claimed that Tremblay was now Pope. In France, Collin's movement broke up into different factions some years after his death in 1974.

In Guadeloupe, the Apostles of Infinite Love established two convents, including one at Pointe-à-Pitre, which became a place of pilgrimage after a girl in 1977 claimed to see a Marian apparition from Our Lady of Tears that lamented apostasy in the Catholic Church.

Since the 1970s, the Apostles of Infinite Love has established a presence in various parts of the globe, including Guadeloupe, Guatemala, the Dominican Republic, Italy, France, South Africa, and the United States.

Its leader, Pope Gregory XVIII, was crowned in 2012.

== Controversies ==
From 1978 to 2001, the religious group was sued because of alleged abuses, including rape, extortion, and sexual abuse. Its millenarianism, apocalypticism, and its rejection of the world has led to frequent characterization of the group as a cult. In 1999, 100 police officers raided their reclusive community in St. Jovite. The co-accused was Reynald Huot, aka Father André. In 2001, the public prosecutor abandoned all charges against Jean-Gaston Tremblay after a 34-year investigation.

In 2005, the city of Brébeuf obtained a decree from the Quebec government allowing it to expropriate the land of the religious group.

In 2011, the Apostles of Infinite Love once again attracted attention after a French Canadian Novice at the group's East Flatbush convent, Mary Turcotte, claimed that she had been raped by a Black man. After a police investigation began, Turcotte recanted her claim, with some media outlets claiming that she had made the accusation to cover up a consensual relationship with a Brooklyn local. Turcotte was later recalled to the group's headquarters in Quebec.

== See also ==
- Antipope
- Palmarian Catholic Church
- Sedevacantism
