= Rogelio del Rosario Martinez =

Filipino antipope (born 1970)

Antipope Michael II
- Papacy began: July 29, 2023
- Predecessor: Michael I
- Opposed to: Francis (2016–2025); Leo XIV (2025–present)

Orders
- Ordination: 2003 by Bishop Joseph V. Galaroza
- Consecration: February 6, 2010 by Archbishop Joel Clemente

Personal details
- Born: Rogelio del Rosario Martinez Jr. October 31, 1970 (age 55) Santa Cruz, Manila, Philippines
- Denomination: Conclavist traditionalist Catholic (since 2020); Formerly; Independent Catholic (2002–2020); Roman Catholic (until 2002)
- Spouse: Lynn Jacinto
- Children: 1
- Motto: Quarite Prime Regnum Dei ("Seek first the kingdom of God" [Mt. 6:33])

Rogelio del Rosario Martinez Jr. (born October 31, 1970), who took the name "Michael II", is a Filipino conclavist bishop claimant to the papacy. He was elected to the See of Saint Peter by lot at a conclave held in Vienna, Austria, in July 2023.

Born in Santa Cruz, Manila, Philippines, Martinez graduated from a Roman Catholic seminary in 1997 but did not seek holy orders. After teaching law at university level, Martinez came into contact with the independent Catholic movement in 2002 and was ordained as a priest in 2003. Elevated to bishop in 2010, Martinez made a profession of faith to David Bawden, known as Pope Michael I of the Vatican in Exile in 2019. David Bawden was an American conclavist who believed that the Roman Catholic hierarchy had apostatized from the Catholic faith since Vatican II, and that there had been no legitimate popes elected since the death of Pope Pius XII in 1958. Bawden organised a conclave, consisting of six lay-people, including himself and his parents, at which he was elected Pope in 1990 to the Vatican in Exile.

Pope Michael I died in August 2022. Martinez was elected as his successor, choosing the papal name Michael II. Pope Michael II continues to reside in the Philippines and speaks both English and Tagalog.

== Biography ==
=== Early life and ordained ministry ===
Martinez was born on October 31, 1970, in Santa Cruz, Manila, Philippines. He was baptized and raised as a Roman Catholic In 1983, after graduating from elementary school, he and his family moved to Bulakan. During his elementary years, he joined a Bible study group of the Convention of Philippine Baptist Churches.

In September 1984 he became an acolyte in his parish in Bulakan and in 1987, after graduating from high school, he entered the Immaculate Conception Major Seminary of the Diocese of Malolos. After graduating with Master's in Pastoral Theology in 1997, he did not submit himself for ordination to the diaconate and remained a layman.

He taught for some years at the Centro Escolar University and later studied law at the Harvardian Colleges School of Law in San Fernando, Pampanga, graduating in 2004. During that period, he married Lynn Jacinto and the two had a child.

In 2002 he came into contact with an independent Catholic priest from the Brazilian Catholic Apostolic Church (ICAB) and resumed his priestly training with such Church, aligning himself with traditionalist Catholicism and sedevacantism, coming to the conclusion that all Popes following the death of Pope Pius XII were invalid because they had endorsed the "heretical" Second Vatican Council. he was ordained on December 7, 2002, and later a priest in 2003 by Bishop Joseph V. Galaroza. He subsequently served as assistant priest at Novaliches and later at Santa Mesa and was installed as parish priest at Our Lady of Fatima Parish Church in San Jose Del Monte, Bulacan in 2004.

In 2009, Martinez founded the Sacrae Crucis Franciscanum, an independent catholic Church to celebrate the sacraments according to the Tridentine Mass. It currently has 200 families.

Seven years later he was consecrated a bishop by Archbishop Joel Clemente and Bishop Heyward Ewart of the Catholic Charismatic Church (CCC) on February 6, 2010, at the St. Andrews Seminary in Quezon City. In 2012, after Clemente's retirement due to health reason, he was appointed Archbishop by the CCC's Patriarch Augustine I (John Walzer).

In 2019, he came into contact with David Bawden, a conclavist bishop who had claimed to be the legitimate Roman pontiff under the name Pope Michael of the Vatican in Exile. One year later he made his profession of faith to Bawden, formally recognizing him as the legitimate Pope and came into full communion with him and his followers.

=== Claim to the papacy ===
Bawden died on August 2, 2022. On July 29, 2023, Martinez was elected in a conclave in Vienna, Austria and he took the name Michael II. Martinez is the leader of a group known as the "Vatican in Exile."

Bishop José R. Rojas of Libmanan who is also the chairman of the Episcopal Commission of Doctrine of the Faith of the Catholic Bishops' Conference of the Philippines advised Catholics not to support Martinez or risk facing excommunication. Rojas says Martinez is not a Catholic priest, and therefore cannot be even be a consecrated bishop under mainstream Roman Catholicism.

Martinez runs a parish in San Jose del Monte in Bulacan. A papal coronation for Martinez took place on October 28, 2023, in Meycauayan.
