= Jean-Gaston Tremblay =

Catholic religious leader and self-proclaimed pope

Antipope Gregory XVII
- Church: Apostles of Infinite Love
- Papacy began: May 1969
- Papacy ended: December 31, 2011
- Predecessor: Clement XV
- Successor: Gregory XVIII
- Opposed to: Paul VI; John Paul I John Paul II; Benedict XVI

Orders
- Ordination: 1962 by Clement XV
- Consecration: 1962 by Clement XV

Personal details
- Born: Jean-Gaston Tremblay; September 8, 1928 Rimouski, Quebec
- Died: December 31, 2011 (aged 83) Sainte Agathe, Quebec
- Criminal charges: Kidnapping; Illegal detention Child abuse Obstruction of justice
- Criminal penalty: 6-month imprisonment (for the last charge; 1977)

Jean-Gaston Tremblay (September 8, 1928 – December 31, 2011) was a traditionalist Catholic religious leader and self-proclaimed pope, with the name Gregory XVII (French: Grégoire XVII). He reigned as antipope in opposition to the Catholic Church from 1969 until his death in 2011.

== Biography ==
Tremblay was born on September 8, 1928, in Rimouski, Quebec. His father was a lumberjack. Raised Catholic, he moved to Montreal at 16, where he joined the Brothers of St. John of God. In 1952 he received permission to form his own community, which he called the Congregation of Jesus and Mary. The community moved from town to town for a number of years, before settling in St. Jovite, in Mont-Tremblant, Quebec, in 1958.

In 1961, Tremblay met Michel Collin, leader of the Apostles of Infinite Love, who had proclaimed himself pope in opposition to John XXIII with the title Clement XV, and Tremblay merged his community with the Apostles of Infinite Love. The following year Collin ordained him a priest and soon afterwards consecrated him bishop. The group attracted traditional Catholics unhappy with the Second Vatican Council. Initially only consisting of men, by the late 1960s it included whole families. This prompted the Social Welfare Court of Saint-Jérôme to rule that it was unsuitable for children. Seventeen children were taken and handed over to social workers, but Tremblay went into hiding with 55 others, leading him to be listed as one of the ten most wanted men in Quebec.

In September 1968, Tremblay claimed that God had elevated him to the papacy, superseding Collin, with the title Pope Gregory XVII. Eight months later Collin acknowledged him as pope. Tremblay linked his papacy with the prophecy of Our Lady of La Salette, as had Collin.

Over the following 40 years, Tremblay was the subject of numerous police investigations into charges of kidnapping, illegal detention, and child abuse. One former member filed a civil suit for $2.5 million in 2001, claiming physical and sexual abuse. Tremblay had served six months in prison in 1977 for defying an order to hand over the boy and his sister to the authorities. Also in 2001, Tremblay and two others were charged with multiple counts of abuse dating back more than 30 years, but the case was dropped.

Tremblay died on December 31, 2011, at a hospital in Sainte Agathe, Quebec.

== See also ==
- Sedevacantism
