= David Bawden =

American antipope (1959–2022)

Antipope Michael
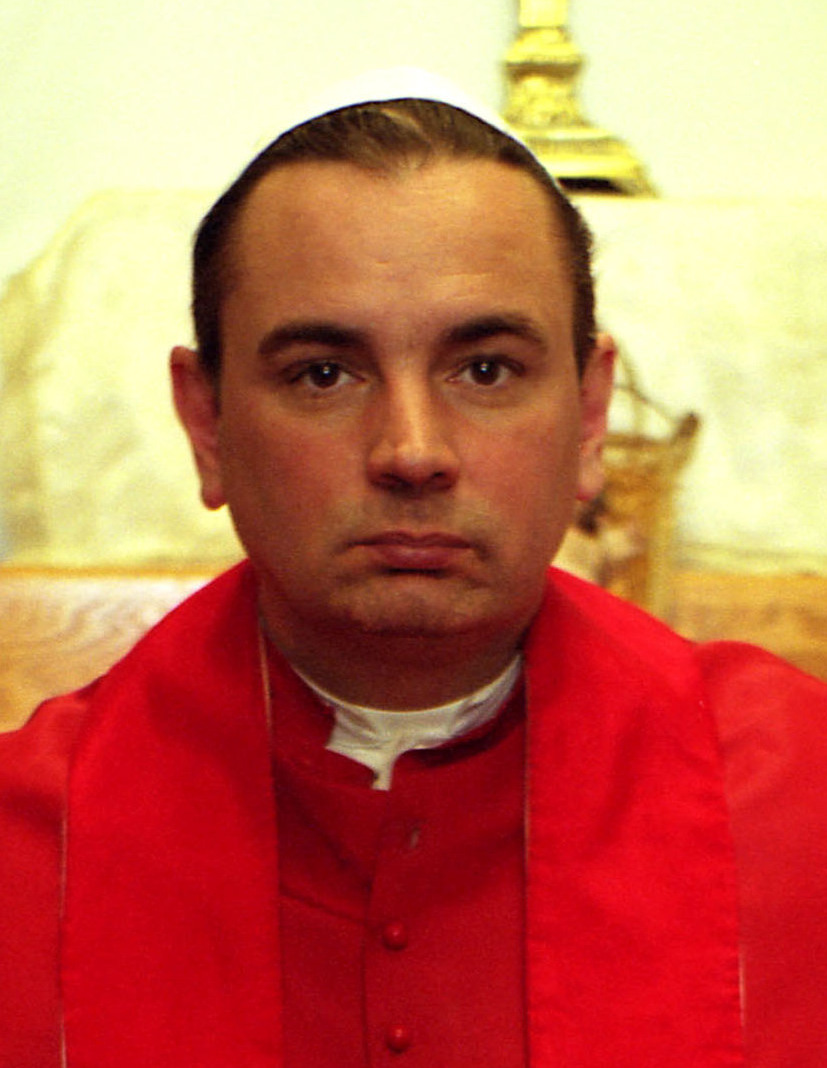
- Bawden in 2008
- Papacy began: July 16, 1990
- Papacy ended: August 2, 2022
- Predecessor: Pope Pius XII (claimed)
- Successor: Michael II
- Opposed to: John Paul II (1978–2005); Benedict XVI (2005–2013); Francis (2013–2022)

Orders
- Ordination: December 11, 2011 by Robert Biarnesen
- Consecration: December 11, 2011 by Robert Biarnesen

Personal details
- Born: David Bawden; September 22, 1959 Oklahoma City, Oklahoma, U.S.
- Died: August 2, 2022 (aged 62) Kansas City, Missouri, U.S.

Ordination history
History
Diaconal ordination
- Ordained by: Robert Biarnesen
- Date: December 11, 2011
Priestly ordination
- Ordained by: Robert Biarnesen
- Date: December 11, 2011
Episcopal consecration
- Consecrated by: Robert Biarnesen
- Date: December 11, 2011

David Allen Bawden (September 22, 1959 – August 2, 2022), who took the name Pope Michael, was an American conclavist claimant to the papacy. Bawden believed that the Catholic Church had apostatized from the Catholic faith after the Second Vatican Council and that there had been no legitimate popes elected since the death of Pope Pius XII in 1958. In 1990, he was elected pope by a group of six laypeople, including himself and his parents. In 2011, he was ordained a priest and consecrated a bishop by an Independent Catholic bishop.

== Early life and education ==
David Allen Bawden was born on September 22, 1959, in Oklahoma City, Oklahoma, to Clara (née Barton) and Kennett Bawden. He attended elementary school and high school in Oklahoma City. He had one brother, Brian.

Bawden's parents were traditionalist Catholics who rejected the Second Vatican Council. In the mid-1970s, he and his family became followers of the Society of St. Pius X (SSPX). Bawden entered the SSPX seminary in Écône, Switzerland, in 1977, then transferred to Saint Joseph's Priory in Armada, Michigan, because of difficulties learning French. He was dismissed in 1978, "without cause" according to Bawden; he later stated in 2012 that it was because of seminary "infighting" he became involved with. His family subsequently moved to St. Marys, Kansas, where the SSPX ran Saint Mary's Academy and College. Bawden worked for the school and his brother attended it. In 1981, Bawden broke with the SSPX. Prior to claiming the papacy, he worked as a real estate agent and furniture maker.

== Claim to the papacy ==
By the mid-1980s, Bawden and his family came to believe that all the popes since the death of Pope Pius XII on October 9, 1958, were modernists, heretics, and apostates, and that their elections were invalid. On July 16, 1990, Bawden, his parents, and three other laypeople held what they claimed to be a papal conclave at the Bawden family's thrift store in Belvue, Kansas. They elected Bawden, then 30 years old, as pope, on the first ballot. Bawden subsequently styled himself "Pope Michael" after Saint Michael the Archangel. Bawden had invited hundreds of Independent Catholic bishops and sedevacantists to the election, but none attended. Since he was not ordained at the time of his election, he was unable to celebrate Mass or confect the sacraments as a priest. He hoped that some bishop in the Soviet Union or China "behind the Iron and Bamboo curtains" and unaware of Vatican II, might one day hear of him and ordain him.

After the election, Bawden continued living at home with his parents. His brother, Brian, expressed confusion about the situation, stating "I'm not for him; I'm not against him; and I don't understand what he's doing." In 1993, Bawden and his parents relocated to Delia, Kansas. His father died in 1995. Bawden established a presence on the internet as an alternative claimant to the papacy; in 2009, he stated that he had approximately 30 "solid followers". He maintained a website for his papacy called Vatican in Exile, and supported himself through donations and by republishing out-of-print religious literature. In 2010, the independent filmmaker Adam Fairholm released a feature-length documentary about him, Pope Michael.

Bawden announced that he had been ordained a priest and then consecrated a bishop on December 11, 2011, by an Independent Catholic episcopus vagans, Bishop Robert Biarnesen of the Duarte-Costa and Old Catholic episcopal lineages, who himself had been consecrated a bishop only a month prior. Bawden then considered himself able to celebrate the Mass and the sacraments of confession and Holy Orders.

== Death ==
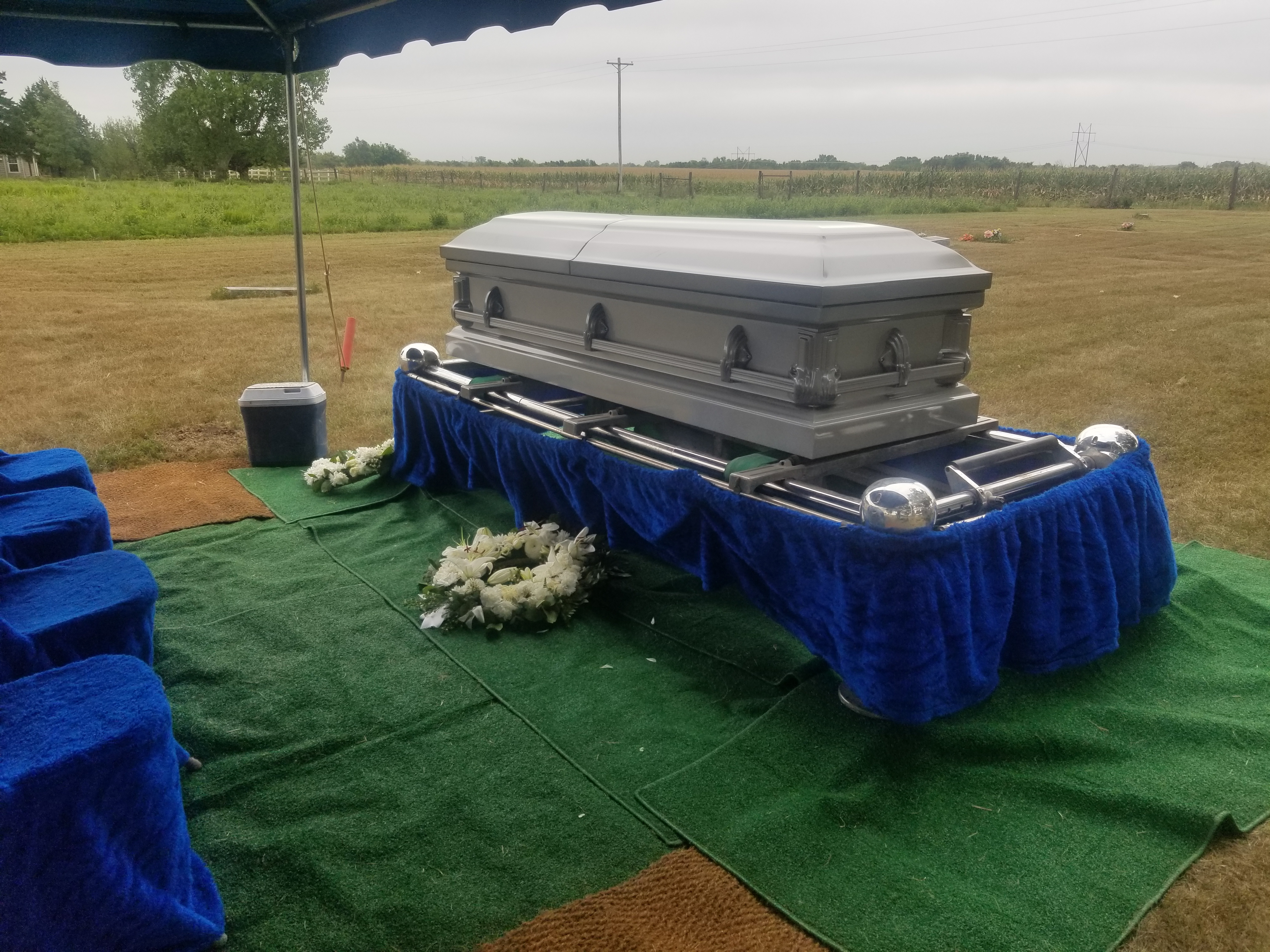
Bawden's burial on August 8, 2022, in Delia, Kansas

On July 10, 2022, the Twitter account for Bawden's church posted that he had to have emergency surgery and was in a coma. Bawden died on August 2, 2022, in Kansas City, Missouri. At the time of his death, he had been serving as the president of the Neighborhood Improvement Association of Oakland, Kansas, and was a member of the Citizen Advisory Council. His obituary simply called him "Father David" and made no reference to his papal claims.

In July 2023, Filipino-born Rogelio del Rosario Martinez claimed to have been elected as Bawden's successor and took the name Pope Michael II.
