= 2026 in religion =

This is a timeline of events during the year 2026 which relate to religion.

== Events ==
=== January ===
- 6 January - The 2025 Jubilee ends.
- 28 January - Sarah Mullally becomes legally Archbishop of Canterbury

=== March ===
- 1 March –
  - Iran confirms the death of its supreme leader Ali Khamenei in a decapitation strike the previous day in Tehran by Israel and the United States. Forty days of mourning are declared.
- 9 March – Mojtaba Khamenei is elected as the next Supreme Leader of Iran.

=== April ===
- April 2 – The National Assembly in Quebec passes the Coalition Avenir Québec (CAQ) government Bill 9 that expands on its secularism law Bill 21. It bans wearing religious symbols for daycare workers and prayer spaces in public institutions. CAQ and Parti Québécois, voted in favour of the legislation, while the Liberals and Québec Solidaire voted against it.
- April 11 – In the United States, Alabama Governor Kay Ivey signs a law that will require public schools to display the Ten Commandments in their classrooms.

=== July ===
- July 1 – 2026 Écône consecrations, members of the Society of Saint Pius X (SSPX) in Écône, Switzerland, consecrated four bishops against the direct orders of Pope Leo XIV, triggering a religious schism between SSPX and the Catholic Church. The consecrations were performed by SSPX Bishop Alfonso de Galarreta, assisted by Bishop Bernard Fellay. The four men consecrated were Michael Goldade, Marc Hanappier, Michel Poinsinet de Sivry, and Pascal Schreiber.

== Religious holy days and observances ==
=== January ===
- 1 – Solemnity of Mary, Mother of God
- 5 – Birthday of Guru Gobind Singh Sahib
- 6 – Epiphany
- 7 – Christmas (Eastern Orthodoxy)
- 26 – Bodhi Day

=== February ===
- 2 – Candlemas
- 15-16 – Maha Shivaratri
- 17 – Ramadan begins
- 18 – Ash Wednesday

=== March ===
- 2-3 – Purim
- 18 – Shri Ramakrishna Jayanti
- 19 – Ramadan ends
- 19-20 – Eid al-Fitr
- 20-21 – Baháʼí Naw-Rúz
- 20-21 – Nowruz
- 25 – Feast of the Annunciation
- 26 – Rama Navami
- 29 – Palm Sunday

=== April ===
- 1 – Passover begins
- 2 – Holy Thursday
- 3 – Good Friday
- 5 – Easter
- 5 – Palm Sunday
- 9 – Holy Thursday (Eastern Orthodoxy)
- 9 – Passover ends
- 10 – Good Friday (Eastern Orthodoxy)
- 12 – Easter (Eastern Orthodoxy)
- 14 – Vaisakhi
- 21 – Ridván begins

=== May ===
- 2 – Ridván ends
- 14 – Feast of the Ascension
- 21-23 – Shavuot
- 23-24 – Declaration of the Bab
- 24 – Pentecost
- 26-27 – Eid-al-Adha
- 28-29 – Ascension of Bahá'u'lláh
- 31 – Trinity Sunday

=== June ===
- 7 – Feast of Corpus Christi
- 12 – Feast of the Sacred Heart
- 18 – Martyrdom of Guru Arjan Dev Sahib
- 24 – Nativity of St. John the Baptist
- 25-26 – Ashura
- 29 – Feast of Saints Peter and Paul

=== July ===
- 9 – Martyrdom of the Bab
- 22-23 – Tisha B'Av
- 31 – Feast of St. Ignatius Loyola

=== August ===
- 15 – Feast of the Assumption of Mary
- 25-26 – Mawlid-al-Nabi

=== September ===
- 4 – Krishna Janmashtami
- 8-15 – Paryushana
- 11-13 – Rosh Hashanah
- 20-21 – Yom Kippur
- 25-2 October – Sukkot

=== October ===
- 2-3 – Shemini Atzeret
- 3-4 – Simchat Torah

=== November ===
- 1 – All Saints' Day
- 2 – All Souls' Day
- 8 – Diwali
- 10 – Birth of the Báb
- 11 – Birth of Baháʼú'lláh
- 16 – Remembering the Martyrs of the UCA
- 22 – Feast of Christ the King
- 24 – Martyrdom of Guru Tegh Bahadur Sahib
- 24 – Birthday of Guru Nanak Dev Sahib
- 26 – Thanksgiving
- 27-28 – Ascension of ʻAbduʼl-Bahá
- 29 – Advent Season Begins

=== December ===
- 3 – Feast of St. Francis Xavier
- 4 – Hanukkah Begins
- 8 – Feast of the Immaculate Conception
- 12 – Feast of Our Lady of Guadalupe
- 24 – Advent Season Ends
- 25 – Christmas
- 26-1 January 2027 – Kwanzaa

== See also ==
- 2026 in Vatican City
- Religion and the Russian invasion of Ukraine
