= Canonical situation of the Society of Saint Pius X =

The Society of Saint Pius X (SSPX) is a group founded in 1970 by Archbishop Marcel Lefebvre. Its canonical situation has been fraught with disputes. In subsequent decades, the various Popes had different stances towards the SSPX, from censure to limited accommodation.

The Society of Saint Pius X has been the subject of much controversy since 1988, when Bernard Fellay, Bernard Tissier de Mallerais, Richard Williamson and Alfonso de Galarreta were illicitly consecrated as bishops at Écône, at the International Seminary of Saint Pius X, in violation of canon law. Lefebvre and the four other SSPX bishops individually incurred a disciplinary latae sententiae excommunication for this schismatic act.

The SSPX maintained that it was canonically established and had never been canonically suppressed. The SSPX further maintains that, in "the present crisis in the Church", when "heresy, and even apostasy, is widely spread amongst the clergy", "the Church mercifully supplies jurisdiction" for the good of the faithful, i.e. in their interpretation of canon law SSPX priests can administer the sacraments even in defiance of the bishops and pope.

In July 2026, four new SSPX bishops were ordained, in defiance of Pope Leo XIV's explicit instruction. In response to this, the Catholic Church officially declared that the bishops having taken part in this consecration had automatically (latae sententiae) earned the penalty of excommunication by participating in schismatic acts of consecrating bishops against the orders of the Pope, and that all lay and clerical SSPX adherents, if they also adhered to the schism, were warned that ipso facto they put themselves in the same position. At the same time, the Church declared that SSPX priests "administer the sacraments illicitly", and that "the sacrament of penance administered by them and marriages assisted by them are invalid".

== Conditions to be in communion with the Catholic Church ==
The SSPX published a letter of Cardinal Gerhard Ludwig Müller, then Prefect of the Congregation for the Doctrine of the Faith, dated 26 June 2017. In this letter are stated conditions that would be required for full re-establishment of communion: making the 1998 profession of faith, accepting explicitly with due adhesion (Note: Archbishop Guido Pozzo, Secretary of the Pontifical Commission Ecclesia Dei, stated that in Vatican II documents dogma must be distinguished from directives, orientations and suggestions for pastoral activity as, for instance, in the Nostra aetate declaration on the relation of the church with non-Christian religions. Pozzo said that the difficulties raised by the SSPX regarding church–state relations and religious liberty, the practice of ecumenism and dialogue with non-Christian religions, certain aspects of liturgical reform and their concrete application, are not obstacles to canonical recognition of the society, and could after such recognition continue to be discussed and clarified, so as to overcome misunderstandings. Dogma, according to the note with which the Congregation for the Doctrine of the Faith accompanied publication of the 1998 profession of faith, must be firmly accepted and held, the other teachings need only be adhered to "with religious submission of will and intellect".) the teachings of the Second Vatican Council and subsequent church teachings, and recognising the validity and legitimacy of the rite of Mass and the other sacraments celebrated according to the liturgical books promulgated after that council.

== Status prior to the 1988 Écône consecrations (1970–1988) ==
At its founding in 1970, the SSPX had clear canonical approval, albeit for simply a six year period. Shortly after its establishment, Lefebvre for various reasons encountered tensions with various Church authorities, which came to a head when in 1974, he made a public statement that questioned the validity of Vatican II and its reforms. This led to the suppression of the SSPX the following year, which received backing from the Holy See and Pope Paul VI. Lefebvre simply ignored the suppression of his society as he was convinced the Pope himself had not actually had a hand in it, but was being manipulated by his Curia. In 1976, Lefebvre proceeded to ordain his seminarians without canonical approval, and thus incurred a canonical penalty of a one year suspension ab ordinum collatione. After further review by the Vatican, he was given the further penalty of a suspension a divinis, and was barred from any exercise of priestly functions.

This situation continued until May 1988, when as a result of negotiations with Cardinal Joseph Ratzinger, then Prefect of the Congregation for the Doctrine of the Faith, Lefebvre signed a protocol intended to regularize the canonical status of SSPX. The first part of the protocol was doctrinal, in which Lefebvre agreed that the SSPX would:

1. promise fidelity to the Catholic Church and its pope;
2. accept the doctrine about the magisterium found in Lumen gentium section 25;
3. pledge to avoid all polemics and to have a positive attitude of study and of communication with the Holy See;
4. recognize the validity of the Mass and of the sacraments as promulgated by Popes Paul VI and John Paul II;
5. promise to respect the common discipline of the church and her laws, including special provisions granted to the SSPX.

The second part of the protocol was juridical, detailing canonical and jurisdictional specifics about how the SSPX would function. This part is divided into six sections. First, the SSPX would be canonically regularized as a clerical society of apostolic life, granting it a fair amount of autonomy and the ability to incardinate its own members. Second, a Roman Commission would be established to deal with any disputes arising with the Society. Two Society members would be part of this Commission. Third, it lays out canonically the relationship of various classes of people to the Society; it notes of laypeople specifically that they will remain under the jurisdiction of the diocesan bishop, but may turn to the Society "by reason of the liturgical [presumably Tridentine] rites". Fourth, it lays down conditions under which ordinations may be carried out. For the immediate future, Lefebvre himself would be authorized to confer ordinations, while in the long term, the protocol envisions a more regular status of a) sending dimissorial letters to a bishop to have members of the Society ordained; or b) the ordination of a bishop in the Society who could perform the ordinations himself. Fifth, it suggests that Pope John Paul II name a bishop from the Society presented by Lefebvre. This bishop should not be the superior general of the Society, but should serve on the Pontifical Commission. Sixth, the protocol agrees that all canonical penalties against Lefebvre would be lifted, and an "amnesty" put in place for all houses of the Society until then operating without ecclesiastical approval.

Shortly after signing the protocol, Lefebvre began to have second thoughts about it and expressed these in communication with Ratzinger. In a June 2 letter, he expressed his intent to consecrate bishops without papal approval. John Paul II wrote him on June 9, telling him not to proceed with this. Lefebvre on June 15 announced his intention to consecrate four bishops. Levebvre brought his intention into action on June 30, 1988, when he consecrated four bishops for the SSPX. In his sermon given on this occasion, he argued it was necessary for him to consecrate the bishops in order to preserve Tradition against distortions after Vatican II and thus remain loyal to the Holy See.

== Status from 1988 to 2008 ==
In June 1988, following the episcopal consecrations without a pontifical mandate, Pope John Paul II declared in his motu proprio letter Ecclesia Dei that the illicit consecrations were a schismatic act which "impli[ed] in practice the rejection of the Roman primacy" and that all six bishops involved in the ceremony had incurred automatic excommunication under the 1983 Code of Canon Law. John Paul II identified this act as rooted in "an incomplete and contradictory notion of Tradition", and addressed to all the followers of Lefebvre's movement a "solemn and heartfelt" appeal to submit to legitimate papal authority and cease giving any support to said movement. He attached to this a warning "that formal adherence to the schism is a grave offence against God and carries the penalty of excommunication decreed by the Church's law".

=== Ecclesia Dei Commission ===
At the same time he declared the SSPX's consecration "a schismatic act", John Paul II set up the Pontifical Commission Ecclesia Dei (PCED) to help those SSPX members and adherents to enter "full ecclesial communion", who wished "to remain united to the Successor of Peter in the Catholic Church while preserving their spiritual and liturgical traditions".

=== The "Hawaii Six" Case ===
On January 18, 1991, bishop Joseph Ferrario of Honolulu issued a formal canonical warning to laywoman Patricia Morley, saying that she and her associates had been engaging in schismatic activities in relation to the SSPX and would be declared excommunicated if they persisted therein. Bishop Ferrario proceeded on May 1, 1991, to issue a formal declaration that these laypeople in question had been ipso facto excommunicated by their schismatic actions. Morley and her associates appealed this decision to the Vatican, and after some back-and-forth, they eventually received reprieve in the form of a June 4, 1993 letter from the Congregation for the Doctrine of the Faith, signed by its then prefect, Joseph Ratzinger. The letter declared that Bishop Ferrario's declaration of excommunication was null on the grounds that Morley's actions, "though blameworthy on various accounts, are not sufficient to constitute the crime of schism". The SSPX sees this decision as vindicating them because it "proved that attending Mass or receiving the sacraments at an SSPX chapel was not considered a schismatic act, let alone worthy of excommunication".

In a 1995 letter, Monsignor Camille Perl, secretary of the PCED, clarified that the Vatican's Judgment in the Hawaii six case "does not confer the Church's approbation upon the Society of St. Pius X or those who frequent their chapels". In this same letter, Perl explained that it would be "morally illicit for the faithful to participate in" SSPX Masses "unless they are physically or morally impeded from participating in a Mass celebrated by a Catholic priest in good standing" and added that unavailability of a Tridentine Mass "is not considered a sufficient motive for attending such [SSPX] Masses". Perl also notes the possibility of entering into schism over a period of repeat association with the SSPX: "While it is true that the participation in the Mass and sacraments at the chapels of the Society of St. Pius X does not of itself constitute 'formal adherence to the schism', such adherence can come about over a period of time as one slowly imbibes a mentality which separates itself from the magisterium of the Supreme Pontiff".

=== Pontifical Council for Legislative Texts ===
==== 1996 letter ====
In 1996, the Pontifical Council for the Interpretation of Legislative Texts (PCILT) responded to an enquiry from Bishop Norbert Brunner of the Diocese of Sion, Switzerland, regarding the correct interpretation of Ecclesia Dei. While the PCILT says that Bishop Brunner's concerns do not meet the requirements for an "authentic interpretation" of the motu proprio Ecclesia Dei, it offers ten notes of clarification that could aid his pastoral concerns regarding the SSPX.

These notes affirm that "doubt cannot reasonably be cast upon the validity of the excommunication of the Bishops declared in the Motu Proprio [Ecclesia Dei] and the Decree [Dominus Marcellus Lefebvre]". The PCILT notes the requirement of formal adherence to schism needed to acquire a latae sententiae excommunication, and offers a tentative description of what "formal adherence to schism" means, with two requirements, an internal one and an external one: 1) "one of internal nature, consisting in a free and informed agreement with the substance of the schism"; 2) "the other of an external character, consisting in the externalising of this option".

It adds of the external requirement that external adherence does not necessarily manifest an internal adherence even in members of the faithful who attend SSPX services to the exclusion of any other. However, it states that "in the case of the Lefebvrian deacons and priests there seems no doubt that their ministerial activity in the ambit of the schismatic movement is a more than evident sign of the fact that the two requirements" for formal adherence to the schism "have been met". The PCILT added: "On the other hand, in the case of the rest of the faithful it is obvious that an occasional participation in liturgical acts or the activity of the Lefebvrian movement, done without making one's own the attitude of doctrinal and disciplinary disunion of such a movement, does not suffice for one to be able to speak of formal adherence to the movement". The Pontifical Council also cautioned about distinguishing the sin of schism from the canonical crime of schism, with its penalty of excommunication, which required the specific conditions of canons 1323–1324 of the 1983 Code of Canon Law.

==== Additional letters ====
In a 1998 letter in response to an Australian layman, PCED secretary Monsignor Camille Perl expressed his thanks to God that the man in question was able to leave the SSPX and "return to full communion with the Church". Perl noted that the Church has not defined what precisely constitutes "formal adherence to the schism", but judged that various documents the man had sent the PCED detailing correspondence with SSPX priests "clearly indicate the extent to which many in authority in the Society of St. Pius X corroborate [the definition of schism in canon law]". Perl specified that "a consistent condemnation of the new Mass, the Pope and anyone who disagrees with the authorities of the Society in the smallest degree [...] is not consistent with the practice of the Catholic faith". Perl concludes his letter by specifying that it "is not an official declaration of the Holy See" and that its level of authority is not infallible, but can be adhered to with moral certitude.

In a 1999 letter in response to an inquiry from an American layman, Monsignor Perl of the PCED stated that it was likely, but not certain, that SSPX priests were adhering to a schism, which would mean that they were excommunicated, but that people who attended Mass celebrated by SSPX priests "because of their attraction to the Traditional Latin Mass and not because they refuse submission to the Roman Pontiff or reject communion with the members of the Church subject to him", were not excommunicated. However, the longer they frequented SSPX chapels, the greater their likelihood of imbibing a schismatic mentality that ultimately risked excommunication.

=== Hoyos on the situation ===
Apart from the formal declarations by the Catholic Church, Cardinal Darío Castrillón Hoyos, president of the PCED, commented about the status of the SSPX in a 2005 interview that the 1988 consecrations, without a pontifical mandate, created a "situation of separation [...] even if it was not a formal schism".

In 2007, when asked "Does the Indult support ecumenism, 'ad intra' (internal)?", Castrillón Hoyos answered that he "reject[s] the term 'ecumenism ad intra'". He stated that the SSPX priests and adherents "are not schismatics" since:

It is Lefebvre who has undertaken an illicit Episcopal consecration and therefore performed a schismatic act. It is for this reason that the Bishops consecrated by him have been suspended and excommunicated. The priests and faithful of the society have not been excommunicated. They are not heretics. I do, however, share Saint Jerome's fear that heresy leads to schism and vice versa. The danger of a schism is big, such as a systematic disobedience vis-à-vis the Holy Father or by a denial of his authority. It is after all a service of charity, so that the Priestly Society gains full communion with the Holy Father by acknowledging the sanctity of the new Mass.

== Status from 2009 to 2025 ==
=== Status under Pope Benedict XVI ===
==== 2009 lifting of bishops' excommunications ====
On January 21, 2009, Cardinal Giovanni Battista Re, prefect of the Congregation for Bishops, issued, with the approval of Pope Benedict XVI, a decree remitting the excommunications on the remaining living bishops whom Lefebvre had consecrated back in 1988. The decree expressed the hope "that this step [of lifting the excommunications] will be followed by the prompt attainment of full communion with the Church on the part of the whole Society of St Pius X, which will thus bear witness to its genuine fidelity and genuine recognition of the Magisterium and authority of the Pope by the proof of visible unity".

In response to some strong, negative reactions to this step, Pope Benedict XVI issued a letter of clarification on the matter in March 2009. In this letter, he draws a distinction between individuals and institutions, and between disciplinary and doctrinal issues. He stresses: "The excommunication affects individuals, not institutions" and was put in place "with the aim of calling those thus punished to repent and to return to unity". The excommunication, he says, was also at the purely disciplinary level. The irregular status of the SSPX is by contrast, a doctrinal matter: "The fact that the Society of Saint Pius X does not possess a canonical status in the Church is not, in the end, based on disciplinary but on doctrinal reasons". Pope Benedict XVI reaffirmed that "until the doctrinal questions are clarified, the Society has no canonical status in the Church, and its ministers – even though they have been freed of the ecclesiastical penalty – do not legitimately exercise any ministry in the Church".

=== Status under Pope Francis ===
On 20 November 2016, Pope Francis personally extended for priests of the society, until further provisions are made, the faculty by which "those faithful who, for various reasons, attend churches officiated by the priests of the Priestly Fraternity of Saint Pius X, can validly and licitly receive the sacramental absolution of their sins", a faculty he had already granted for the duration of the 2015–16 Jubilee Year. Confession, along with marriage, requires the granting of the required faculty for validity: "The valid absolution of sins requires that the minister have, in addition to the power of orders, the faculty of exercising it for the faithful to whom he imparts absolution" (1983 Code of Canon Law, can. 966.1).

In a document from the Congregation of the Doctrine of the Faith, published on 4 April 2017, local ordinaries are authorized to grant SSPX priests faculties to assist at marriages validly. For the validity of marriage, marital consent must be declared "before the local ordinary, pastor, or a priest or deacon delegated by either of them" (canon 1108).

For any priest, other than the pastor (parish priest) or local ordinary of the parties, to be "competent to assist", he must receive the faculty from the parties' pastor or local ordinary. The 2017 letter from the Congregation of the Doctrine of the Faith specifically grants local ordinaries (not the pastors) permission, in some circumstances, to delegate SSPX priests to assist in celebrating marriages of faithful who follow the pastoral activity of the society. Insofar as possible, the local ordinary is to delegate a priest of his diocese (or at least "a fully regular priest") to receive the parties' consent during the marriage rite, which Mass then follows, celebrated perhaps by a priest of the society. If this is not possible and "if there are no priests in the Diocese able to receive the consent of the parties, the Ordinary may grant the necessary faculties to the priest of the Society who is also to celebrate the Holy Mass".

== Status from 2026 to today ==
=== New consecrations and status under Pope Leo XIV ===
On 1 July 2026, Bishop Alfonso de Galarreta carried out four consecrations without papal mandate in Écône, Switzerland. As a result, the Dicastery for the Doctrine of the Faith formally decreed the excommunication of the entire order on 2 July 2026, declaring the bishop-consecrators and ordained bishops by them, the ministers belonging to the Society, and the lay faithful who formally adhere to the Society, as schismatics. Furthermore, the Dicastery declared that the sacraments to be administered by the Society's ministers are considered illicit, and the Sacrament of Reconciliation ministered and marriages assisted by them are rendered invalid.

On 11 July 2026, SSPX appealed with the Dicastery for the Doctrine of the Faith against the excommunication decree.

== Sanctions at the diocesan level ==
In 1991, Bishop Joseph Ferrario of the Diocese of Honolulu declared that six adherents of the SSPX movement were excommunicated for, among other things, procuring the services of SSPX bishop Richard Williamson to illicitly administer confirmation. They sought hierarchical recourse from the Holy See to reverse the decree. The Holy See found in a review of the case that the submitted facts of the case were not formal schismatic acts, so the decree lacked foundation under the cited canons and was therefore invalid.

In 1996, Bishop Fabian Bruskewitz (one of the first American bishops to allow the traditional Mass after the Novus Ordo mass became widespread) of the Diocese of Lincoln, Nebraska, issued a warning that Catholics within the diocese who are "members" of the SSPX incur excommunication. He included them with other groups such as those who campaign for abortion. (Note: The 12 organizations which are "incompatible with the Catholic Faith" that Bruskewitz named include the SSPX, Planned Parenthood, Hemlock Society, Call to Action, Catholics for a Free Choice, and masonic organizations.) In correspondence with the SSPX he described them as a "non-Catholic cult" and "sect".

In 2014, Bishop Marcello Semeraro of the Diocese of Albano, Italy, issued a warning that Catholics within that diocese would incur excommunication for attending SSPX Masses or receiving sacraments from SSPX priests "because the society has no canonical status".

== SSPX and Holy See's views on jurisdiction ==
To absolve sins licitly, a priest must be given the faculty to do so, a faculty that, normally, only the local bishop can give. Similarly, in normal circumstances a marriage can be contracted validly only in the presence of the local bishop or the parish priest or of a priest or deacon delegated by one of these.

The ministers of the SSPX, however, are outside of the Catholic Church and therefore are not named as local bishops.

To overcome this difficulty, the SSPX argues that absolution and marriage under its auspices are valid, because of its interpretation of canon law. They believe that in "the present crisis in the Church", when "heresy, and even apostasy, is widely spread amongst the clergy", "the Church mercifully supplies jurisdiction" for the good of the faithful, i.e. in their interpretation of canon law SSPX priests can administer the sacraments even in defiance of the bishops and pope.

== Question of the schismatic status of the SSPX ==
In the years following the establishment of the PCED, the Vatican continuously discouraged attendance at SSPX liturgies, warning of the dangers of formal adherence to Lefebvre's schism that could arise from this, while at the same time remaining reticent to declare anyone schismatic who did attend such liturgies. Various letters sent from Vatican commissions during the 90s show that the general attitude towards the SSPX on the part of the Vatican was that while SSPX priests likely satisfied the requirements for formal schism, the status of laity who associated with the SSPX could not be determined to be formally schismatic.

== Canonical sanctions on members ==
=== Holy See's 2009 lifting of excommunication of bishops ===
Lefebvre died in 1991 as an excommunicated person. In their 2008 petition, the four surviving SSPX bishops "acknowledged the supreme authority of the Holy Father, and noted that 'the current situation causes us much suffering'". In 2009, the Congregation for Bishops remitted the excommunication of the four surviving SSPX bishops.

Pope Benedict XVI explained that the SSPX has no canonical status in the Catholic Church for doctrinal reasons and that SSPX ministers "do not legitimately exercise any ministry in the Church".

=== Suspension a divinis ===
Although the 1988 excommunication of the four SSPX bishops was remitted in 2009, the SSPX bishops and priests were still unable to exercise any episcopal or priestly ministry in the Catholic Church.

According to canon 1383 of the 1983 Code of Canon Law, a suspension a divinis affects SSPX clergy who have been ordained to the priesthood illegitimately.

=== 2026 excommunications ===
In July 2026, following an episcopal consecration by the SSPX against the will of the Pope, the Holy See declared that the Society of St. Pius X was schismatic and decreed its excommunication.

== See also ==
- Dialogue between the Holy See and the Society of Saint Pius X
