= Seminario Nuestra Señora Corredentora =

Seminary of Our Lady Co-Redemptrix
- Seminario Nuestra Señora Corredentora
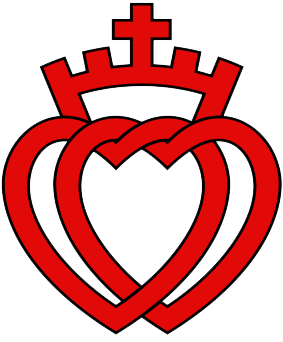
- Logo of the Society of Saint Pius X
- Established: 1978
- Parent institution: Society of Saint Pius X
- Affiliations: Roman Catholic
- Director: Rev. Fr. Davide Pagliarani, SSPX
- Academic staff: 5
- Administrative staff: 1
- Location: La Reja, Moreno Partido, Buenos Aires, Argentina
- Language: Spanish; Portuguese
- Founder: Archbishop Marcel Lefebvre
- Website: lareja.fsspx.org

The Seminario Nuestra Señora Corredentora (English: Seminary of Our Lady Co-Redemptrix) is a Roman Catholic major seminary of the Society of Saint Pius X located in La Reja, Moreno Partido, Buenos Aires, Argentina.

== List of rectors ==
1. Fr. Jean-Michel Faure, SSPX (1978–1988)
2. Bishop Alfonso de Galarreta, SSPX (1988–?)
3. Fr. Dominique Lagneau, SSPX (?–2003)
4. Bishop Richard Williamson, SSPX (2003–2009)
5. Bishop Alfonso de Galarreta, SSPX (2009–2012)
6. Fr. Davide Pagliarani, SSPX

== Notable people ==
=== Notable faculty ===
- Bishop Jean-Michel Faure, served as founding rector
- Bishop Alfonso de Galarreta, served as a professor and twice as rector
- Bishop Richard Williamson, served as rector

== See also ==
- List of Roman Catholic seminaries
- Society of St. Pius X
