= Écône consecrations =

Écône consecrations may refer to:

- The 1988 Écône consecrations, where Marcel Lefebvre consecrated bishops for the Society of St. Pius X
- The 2026 Écône consecrations, where new bishops were consecrated for the Society of St. Pius X
