= Michael Goldade =

American SSPX bishop (born 1980)

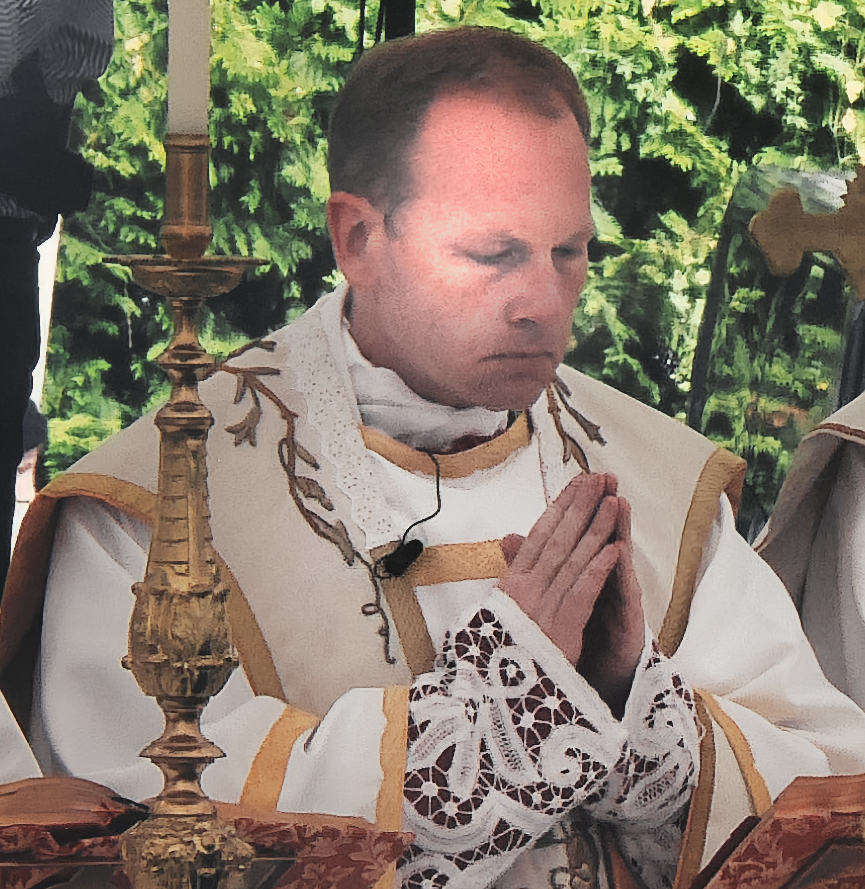
- Goldade concelebrating Mass during his consecration, 2026
- Other post: Rector of Saint Thomas Aquinas Seminary in Dillwynn (2023 – present)

Orders
- Ordination: June 19, 2004 by Richard Williamson
- Consecration: July 1, 2026 by Alfonso de Galarreta

Personal details
- Born: February 28, 1980 (age 46) Williston, North Dakota, US
- Motto: Adeamus cum fiducia (Latin for 'Let us go with confidence')
- Coat of arms

Michael Goldade (born February 28, 1980) is an American Traditionalist Catholic bishop of the Society of Saint Pius X, an organization declared to be in schism by the Holy See.

He was consecrated a bishop by the SSPX without papal approval in the 2026 Écône consecrations, which led to the Dicastery for the Doctrine of the Faith decreeing his excommunication latae sententiae.

== Biography ==
Goldade was born on February 28, 1980 in Williston, North Dakota, and raised in St. Marys, Kansas. He has nine siblings, three of whom are religious sisters with the SSPX. He entered seminary for the Society at the age of 18, being educated in Winona, Minnesota. Goldade was also ordained at the seminary in Winona in 2004 by the then-excommunicated SSPX bishop Richard Williamson.

His first assignment following ordination was at St. Anne Chapel in Armada, Michigan where he served for five years before serving as director of a retreat house in Ridgefield, Connecticut. Beginning in 2014, Goldade was appointed prior of the SSPX in Kansas City, also having oversight for the parish church of St. Vincent, a school, and a community of sisters. He also oversaw major renovations and restorations to the church.

In 2021, Goldade was named assistant to the District Superior, and two years later was appointed as rector of St. Thomas Aquinas Seminary in Dillwyn, Virginia.

In 2023, he became the rector of the St. Thomas Aquinas Seminary in Dillwyn, Virginia.

=== Consecration and Excommunication ===
On May 26, 2026, the SSPX announced that Goldade was chosen to become a bishop. Pope Leo XIV repeatedly asked the SSPX not to consecrate him. Goldade's episcopal ordination took place on July 1, 2026, during the SSPX episcopal consecrations in Écône, Switzerland, by Alfonso de Galarreta. Bernard Fellay was the sole co-consecrator. Because he was consecrated without a papal mandate, the Holy See decreed that Goldade was automatically excommunicated. The SSPX does not consider this excommunication valid.
