= Dialogue between the Holy See and the Society of Saint Pius X =

Roman Catholic Church issue since 1988

The Holy See formally declared the Society of St. Pius X (SSPX) and its adherents to be in schism and excommunicated them in 1988 following illicit consecrations of bishops. The SSPX considers itself never to have been excommunicated nor to be or have been in schism.

Discussions since then have been complex, stemming from the society's insistence that the teachings of the Second Vatican Council on ecumenism, religious liberty, and collegiality are inconsistent with Catholic teaching and doctrine, a claim that the Holy See views as unacceptable. Following an SSPX episcopal consecration in 2026, the Holy See again declared that the Society of St. Pius X was schismatic and decreed its excommunication.

== Under Pope John Paul II ==
=== 1988 excommunications ===
Pope John Paul II established the pontifical commission Ecclesia Dei on 2 July 1988 for the care of those former followers of Archbishop Marcel Lefebvre who broke with him as a result of his consecration of four priests of his Society of St. Pius X as bishops on 30 June 1988, an act that the Holy See deemed illicit and a schismatic act.

In 1994, the Pontifical Council for Promoting Christian Unity stated that "[t]he situation of the members of [the SSPX] is an internal matter of the Catholic Church".

=== Role of Cardinal Castrillón Hoyos and SSPX prerequisites ===
Cardinal Darío Castrillón Hoyos, president of the Pontifical Commission Ecclesia Dei, approached the SSPX bishops during the pilgrimage and, according to Bishop Fellay, told them that the pope was prepared to grant them either a personal prelature (a new juridical structure introduced by Vatican II; presently Opus Dei is the only personal prelature) or an apostolic administration (the status given to the traditionalist priests of Campos, Brazil). The SSPX leadership responded with distrust, saying that Castrillón was vague on how the new structure would be implemented and sustained, and criticising the Holy See's allegedly heavy-handed treatment of the Priestly Fraternity of St. Peter. The SSPX requested two preliminary "signs" before continuing negotiations: that the Holy See grant permission for all priests to celebrate the Tridentine Mass, and that its statement that the 1988 consecrations had resulted in excommunication for the clerics involved be declared void.

=== 2002 letter ===
Cardinal Castrillón refused to grant interviews on the subject, in order "to maintain the privacy of the details of our dialogue", though this silence was broken when his letter of 5 April 2002 to Bishop Bernard Fellay was later published. This contained the text of a protocol summarizing the meeting between the two men held on 29 December 2000. This envisaged a reconciliation on the basis of the protocol of 5 May 1988 between the Holy See and the SSPX, and the 1988 excommunications would be lifted rather than declared null.

From 2003 onwards, the annual reports of the Ecclesia Dei Commission began to report on dialogue between the Vatican authorities and the SSPX, beginning with "some high-level meetings and [...] an exchange of correspondence" in 2003, continuing with "dialogue at various levels [...] [and] meetings, some at a high level" in 2004, and leading to "somewhat improved" dialogue with "more concrete proposals" in 2005.

== Under Pope Benedict XVI ==
The year 2005 was of great significance because it saw the accession to the papacy of Pope Benedict XVI, who had participated in the 1988 negotiations and who was seen as being sympathetic to the use of the Tridentine liturgy. In August 2005, Benedict met with Bishop Fellay for 35 minutes, at the latter's request. There was no breakthrough, but statements from both sides spoke of the atmosphere as positive. It was reported that the SSPX question was among the topics for discussion at meetings of the Pope with cardinals and Curia officials in early 2006.

In an interview, Cardinal Darío Castrillón Hoyos considered that the 1988 consecration was not a schismatic act, on the basis that Lefebvre was merely consecrating auxiliary bishops rather than attempting to establish a parallel church.

=== Prerequisites of the SSPX ===
In 2005, Bishop Fellay, then Superior of the SSPX, said it had two prerequisites to enter into a doctrinal discussion with the Catholic Church: the free use of the Traditional Latin Mass (also called Tridentine Mass) throughout the whole Catholic Church, and the lifting of the 1988 excommunications.

=== Summorum Pontificum ===
In July 2007, the Pope issued Summorum Pontificum, which liberalised the restrictions on the celebration of the Tridentine Mass. In an accompanying letter, he wrote that he wished to see "an interior reconciliation in the heart of the Church" and "to make every effort to enable for all those who truly desire unity to remain in that unity or to attain it anew".

Bishop Fellay, while welcoming the Pope's decision, referred to "the difficulties that still remain", and stated that the SSPX wished that the new "favourable climate" would "make it possible – after the decree of excommunication which still affects its bishops has been withdrawn – to consider more serenely the disputed doctrinal issues."

In April 2008, Bishop Fellay issued Letter to Friends and Benefactors No. 72, informing the SSPX faithful that, in spite of both Summorum Pontificum and the recent Vatican documents on the true meaning of Lumen gentium and evangelisation, the Society still could not sign an agreement with the Holy See, which was not going to deal with doctrinal errors.

Two months later, after a meeting held in Rome between the two, Cardinal Castrillòn Hoyos indicated five conditions that SSPX must comply with as a preparatory step for achieving full communion. The Cardinal did not ask in an explicit way for acceptance of the Second Vatican Council as a true Ecumenical Council or of the validity of the Mass of Paul VI, matters on which the Secretariat of State later made clear agreement is required for unity of doctrine. In the homily Fellay preached at Lourdes for the SSPX Pilgrimage, on 26 October 2008, he replied that the Vatican requests were ambiguous. He also launched a new Rosary Crusade for 1 November to Christmas 2008. The first such Crusade was undertaken to ask for liberalization of Tridentine Mass. The second was to pray that the 1988 excommunications be declared void.

=== Remission of the excommunication ===
By a decree of 21 January 2009, which was issued in response to a renewed request dated 15 December 2008 that Bishop Fellay made on behalf of all four bishops whom Lefebvre had consecrated on 30 June 1988, the Prefect of the Congregation for Bishops, by the power expressly granted to him by Pope Benedict XVI, remitted the automatic excommunication that they had thereby incurred, and expressed the wish that this would be followed speedily by full communion of the whole of the Society of Saint Pius X with the Church, thus bearing witness, by the proof of visible unity, to true loyalty and true recognition of the Pope's Magisterium and authority.

A Note of the Secretariat of State issued on 4 February 2009 specified that, while the lifting of the excommunication freed the four bishops from a very grave canonical penalty, it made no change in the juridical situation of the Society of St. Pius X, which continued to lack canonical recognition in the Catholic Church, and that the four bishops remained without any canonical function in the Church and were not exercising legitimately any ministry within it. The note added that future recognition of the Society required full recognition of the Second Vatican Council and of the teaching of Popes John XXIII, Paul VI, John Paul I, John Paul II and Benedict XVI, and repeated the assurance given in the decree of 21 January 2009 that the Holy See would study, along with those involved, the questions not yet settled, so as to reach a full satisfactory solution of the problems that had given rise to the split.

Pope Benedict XVI confirmed this stance in his motu proprio Ecclesiae unitatem of 2 July 2009, in which he declared that by lifting the excommunication of the four bishops he "intended to remove an impediment that might have jeopardized the opening of a door to dialogue and thereby to invite the Bishops and the 'Society of St Pius X' to rediscover the path to full communion with the Church. [...] [T]he remission of the excommunication was a measure taken in the context of ecclesiastical discipline to free the individuals from the burden of conscience constituted by the most serious of ecclesiastical penalties. However, the doctrinal questions obviously remain and until they are clarified the Society has no canonical status in the Church and its ministers cannot legitimately exercise any ministry".

=== Fellay–Levada talks (2009–2011) ===
In 2009, Pope Benedict XVI gave the Congregation for the Doctrine of the Faith, then headed by Cardinal William Levada the task of continuing the dialogue with the Society of St Pius X on theological issues in the hope of attaining reconciliation. The team responsible for the dialogue with the Society of St. Pius X on behalf of the Catholic Church included Charles Morerod, former Rector Magnificus and theology and philosophy professor of the Pontifical University of Saint Thomas Aquinas, Angelicum.

In February 2011, Bishop Bernard Fellay, said that reconciliation talks with the Vatican would soon be coming to an end, with little change in the views of either side. In addition to disputes over the changes introduced by the Second Vatican Council, new problems had been created by plans to beatify Pope John Paul II on 1 May 2011, which, he said, posed "a serious problem, the problem of a pontificate that caused things to proceed by leaps and bounds in the wrong direction, along 'progressive' lines, toward everything that they call 'the spirit of Vatican II.'"

On 14 September 2011, Cardinal Levada met Bishop Fellay and presented to him a document referred to as a doctrinal preamble to possible rehabilitation of the Society and the granting to it of a canonical status within the Church. It was planned to publish the preamble or a revised version of it only after agreement with the SSPX, but the document was believed to consist essentially in the profession of faith required of persons taking up offices in the Church.

=== Rejection of the Congregation's proposal ===
The Society responded to the Congregation's proposal on 21 December 2011 with what the Congregation considered documentation rather than a reply, and in the following month the SSPX delivered a substantive reply.

A further meeting between Levada and Fellay took place on 16 March 2012, at which Levada handed Fellay a letter evaluating the Society's response. The Holy See published a note that declared:

"In compliance with the decision by Pope Benedict XVI, the evaluation of the response of His Excellency Bishop Fellay was communicated to him by a letter delivered to him today. This evaluation notes that the position that he expressed is not sufficient to overcome the doctrinal problems that are at the basis of the rift between the Holy See and the aforesaid Society. At the conclusion of today's meeting, out of a concern for avoiding an ecclesial rupture with painful and incalculable consequences, the Superior General of the Society of Saint Pius X was invited to be so kind as to clarify his position so as to heal the existing rift, as Pope Benedict XVI wished."

The Society, which was reported to be deeply divided on the issue of acceptance or rejection, was given until 15 April 2012 to clarify its position.

On 17 April 2012 the response reached the Congregation for the Doctrine of the Faith, which studied it and submitted it to the judgement of Pope Benedict XVI. Another meeting between Levada and Fellay took place on 13 June 2012, at which the cardinal presented the Holy See's evaluation of the April response of the Society and proposed a personal prelature as the most appropriate instrument for any future canonical recognition of the Society. Bishop Fellay indicated that he could not sign the document of the Holy See's evaluation. In reply to an enquiry by Fellay whether the evaluation had been truly approved by the Pope, Benedict XVI sent him a hand-written letter assuring him that it was indeed his personal decision.

In July 2012, the Society held a general chapter to consider the June communication from the Holy See and issued a declaration that

"the Society continues to uphold the declarations and the teachings of the constant Magisterium of the Church in regard to all the novelties of the Second Vatican Council which remain tainted with errors, and also in regard to the reforms issued from it".

The Holy See declared that it awaited an official response from the Society. In an interview on 4 October 2012, Archbishop Gerhard Ludwig Müller, the new President of the Pontifical Commission "Ecclesia Dei", remarked, with regard to the Holy See's demand that the Society accept the decisions of the Second Vatican Council, including those on religious freedom and human rights: "In a pastoral sense, the door is always open"; he added: "We cannot put the Catholic faith at the mercy of negotiations. Compromise does not exist in this field. I think that there can now be no new discussions." Again on 27 October 2012, the Pontifical Commission stated that the Society had indicated on 6 September 2012 that it needed more time to prepare its response to the Holy See's initiatives. The Commission commented:

"After thirty years of separation, it is understandable that time is needed to absorb the significance of these recent developments. As Our Holy Father Pope Benedict XVI seeks to foster and preserve the unity of the Church by realizing the long hoped-for reconciliation of the Priestly Fraternity of St. Pius X with the See of Peter – a dramatic manifestation of the munus Petrinum in action – patience, serenity, perseverance and trust are needed."

A December 2012 letter, in English and in French, from Archbishop Joseph Augustine Di Noia, Vice-President of the Pontifical Commission Ecclesia Dei, to all the members of the society indicated that the official reply of Bishop Fellay had not yet been received. Archbishop Di Noia lamented that some of the society's superiors "employ language, in unofficial communications, that to all the world appears to reject the very provisions, assumed to be still under study, that are required for the reconciliation and for the canonical regularization of the Fraternity within the Catholic Church". He added:

"The only imaginable future for the Priestly Fraternity lies along the path of full communion with the Holy See, with the acceptance of an unqualified profession of the faith in its fullness, and thus with a properly ordered ecclesial, sacramental and pastoral life."

== Under Pope Francis ==
In a declaration of 27 June 2013, the remaining three bishops of the society (after the expulsion of Richard Williamson in 2012) said that "the cause of the grave errors which are in the process of demolishing the Church does not reside in a bad interpretation of the conciliar texts – a 'hermeneutic of rupture' which would be opposed to a 'hermeneutic of reform in continuity' – but truly in the texts themselves", and declared that the Mass as celebrated by the Pope and the generality of the Catholic Church's bishops and priests is "penetrated with an ecumenical and Protestant spirit, democratic and humanist, which empties out the sacrifice of the Cross". The Catholic News Agency saw this declaration as a repudiation of Pope Benedict XVI's teaching that the Second Vatican Council should be interpreted in a "hermeneutic of continuity" with previous Church teaching and as indicating a definitive break with the Catholic Church.

On 12 October 2013, Fellay declared, "We thank God, we have been preserved from any kind of agreement from last year", and said that the society had withdrawn the text that it presented to Rome on 15 April 2012, at the same time declaring that Pope Francis was "a genuine Modernist".

Fellay expressed a different view about Pope Francis on 11 May 2014, saying that he had read twice a biography of Archbishop Lefebvre and enjoyed it:

With the current pope, as he is a practical man, he looks at people. What a person thinks, what he believes, is at the end a matter of indifference to him. What matters is that this person be sympathetic in his view, that he seems correct to him, one may say it like this./ And therefore he read twice Bp. Tissier de Mallerais' book on Abp. Lefebvre, and this book pleased him; he is against all that we represent, but, as a life, it pleased him.

He also described how Pope Francis took a tolerant view of the FSSPX in Argentina, Fellay claimed the Pope had told him:

I will not condemn them, and I will not stop anyone from visiting them.

The Italian newspaper Corriere della Sera published on 22 December 2013 an interview with Archbishop Müller in which he was asked: "Now that the discussions have failed, what is the situation of the Lefebvrians?" Müller replied:

"The canonical excommunication for the illicit ordinations has been lifted from the bishops, but the sacramental de facto excommunication for schism remains; they have departed from communion with the Church. We do not follow that up by shutting the door, we never do, and we call on them to be reconciled. But on their part too, they must change their attitude and accept the Catholic Church's conditions and the Supreme Pontiff as the definitive criterion of membership."

=== Extraordinary Jubilee of Mercy ===
In 2016, in commemoration of the Extraordinary Jubilee of Mercy, Pope Francis granted permission for priests of the Society of Saint Pius X to validly confer absolution, while they previously did not possess the jurisdiction needed to confer this sacrament.

=== Filial correction ===
In August 2017, Bishop Fellay joined 61 other Catholic theologians and critics of Pope Francis in signing the Correctio filialis de haeresibus propagatis, a filial correction regarding seven alleged heresies contained in Pope Francis's apostolic exhortation Amoris laetitia. The Holy See did not respond to the filial correction. However, Vatican secretary of state, Cardinal Pietro Parolin, indirectly addressed the controversy, advocating for those who disagree with the Pope to dialogue with the church and “find ways to understand one another.”

=== Suppression of the Pontifical Commission Ecclesia Dei ===
Pope Francis suppressed the Commission and merged its responsibilities into the Congregation for the Doctrine of the Faith on 17 January 2019, and the Holy See Press Office published his decree on 19 January. He said that the outstanding issues were "of a doctrinal nature" and that a group within the CDF would take on the Commission's responsibilities.

A Vatican source said Francis' action represented "a normalization of the ecclesiastical status of traditionalist communities in the Pius X ambit which many years ago were reconciled with the See of Peter, as well as those celebrating the extraordinary form". The source characterized the suppression as a "mundane" reorganization that recognized how much the Commission had achieved in establishing traditional communities within the Church.

== Under Pope Leo XIV ==
In August 2025, the Vatican included a pilgrimage from the SSPX on its official 2025 Jubilee calendar.

In an interview with Davide Pagliarani (Superior General of the Society of Saint Pius X) in April 2026, regarding the controversies surrounding the SSPX's announcement of new consecrations without Papal permission and the risks of this leading to a full-blown schism, he stated that de jure a state of schism already exists according to Canon Law (an interpretation he says was reaffirmed by "rigorous" canonists such as Raymond Burke and Camille Perl), but that representatives of the Holy See have treated the dispute de facto as if the SSPX were not schismatic in order to appease them (using the formula of "irregular canonical situation"), which has led the SSPX to not consider the threat of its canonical schism to be serious.

=== 2026 excommunications ===
In July 2026, following an episcopal consecration by the SSPX against the will of the Pope, the Holy See declared that the Society of St. Pius X was schismatic and decreed its excommunication.

== See also ==
- Canonical situation of the Society of Saint Pius X
