= 1988 Écône consecrations =

1988 consecrations of SSPX bishops

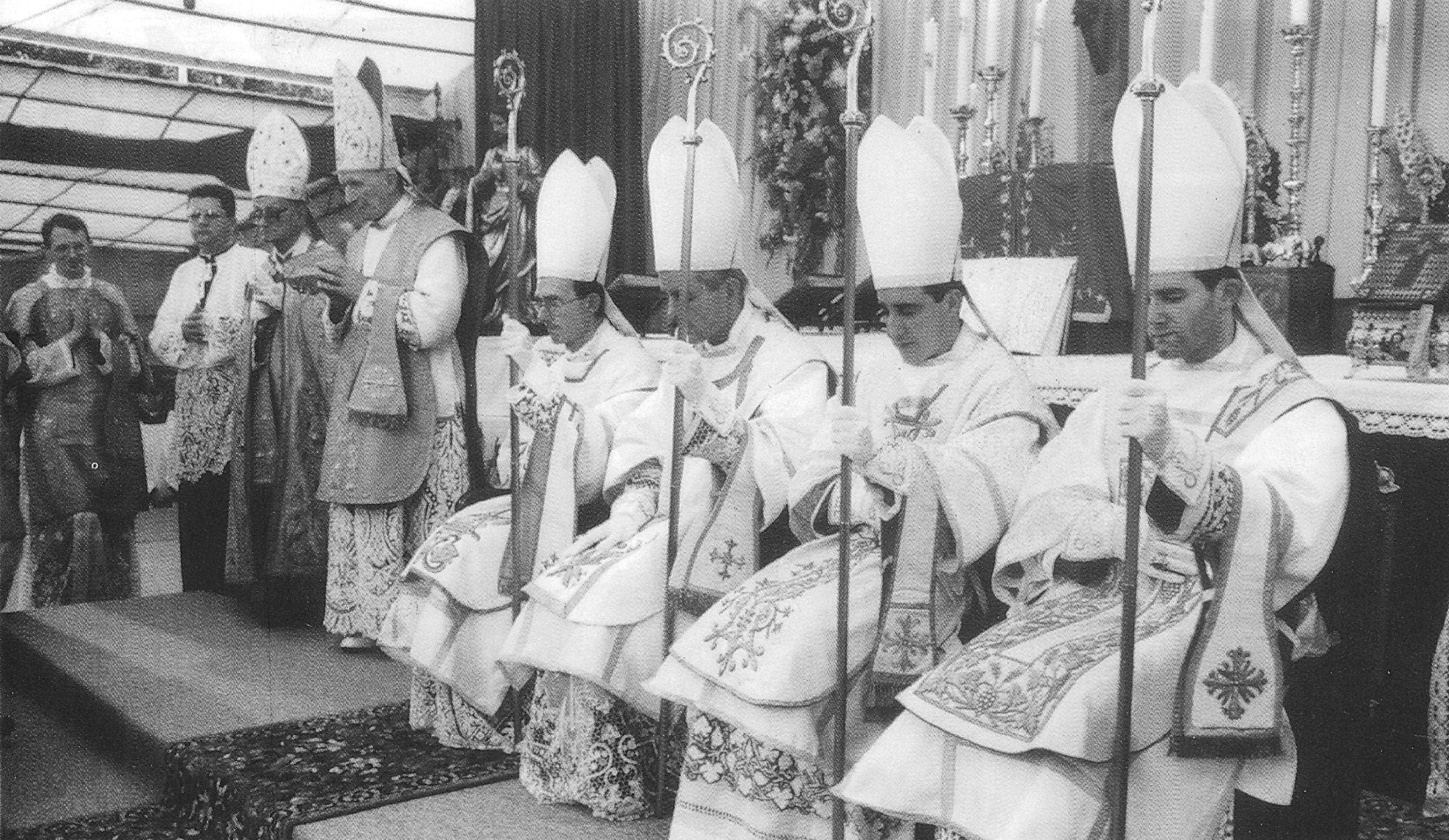
The consecrated Bishops after their episcopal consecration

On 30 June 1988, Archbishop Marcel Lefebvre and Bishop Antônio de Castro Mayer consecrated four bishops – priests of Lefebvre's Society of Saint Pius X (SSPX) – in Écône, Switzerland, against the explicit orders of Pope John Paul II. The consecrations represented a milestone in the troubled relationship of Lefebvre and the SSPX with the Church leadership. The Holy See's Congregation for Bishops issued a decree declaring that Lefebvre, De Castro Mayer, and the consecrated bishops, had incurred automatic excommunication by participating in the consecration of bishops without papal consent, thus putting themselves and the SSPX followers in schism.

On 24 January 2009, Pope Benedict XVI lifted the excommunications of the four bishops Lefebvre had consecrated in 1988, but the SSPX did not return into full communion with the Holy See. The two surviving bishops were again excommunicated, along with all SSPX clergy, following the 2026 Écône consecrations, which also resulted in the Holy See declaring the SSPX schismatic.

== Canon law ==
Under the Catholic 1983 Code of Canon Law, canon 1013, the consecration of a bishop requires the permission of the Pope; and according to canon 1014 (unless a papal dispensation has been granted) at least three consecrating bishops are needed. Violation of the rule requiring the Pope's permission entails automatic (latae sententiae) excommunication of both the consecrator and the recipient of the consecration. In this case there was not only an absence of permission but an actual prohibition by the Pope.

Lefebvre and his supporters argued that the circumstances under which the consecrations took place were such that none of the clergy involved was truly excommunicated. One of their arguments was that a "state of necessity" existed in which the ordinary provisions of canon law could be set aside. The Pontifical Council for Legislative Texts rejected this argument, stating in a 1996 explanatory note that "there is never a necessity to ordain Bishops contrary to the will of the Roman Pontiff". Pius XII stated in Ad Apostolorum principis that the sacramental activity of illicitly consecrated bishops was "gravely" so, "that is, criminal and sacrilegious", and rejected the defence of necessity put forward by those involved. Pope Pius IX, while condemning an ongoing schism in the Patriarchate of Cilicia, declared in 1873 that the right to appoint Bishops belongs to the Holy See by divine law, while Pius VI, regarding the French bishop who had endorsed the civil constitution of the clergy in 1790, stated that episcopal appointments need to be confirmed by the Roman Pontiff.

== Announcement of the consecrations ==
In 1983 (at the age of 78), while in the United States, he reportedly sounded out the American priests of the SSPX about the prospect of him consecrating bishops. Superiors of the society who objected to the idea were removed from their posts as a result. In 1986–1987, the Society's adherents in St Mary's, Kansas, were required to attend a series of catechetical sessions in which they were prepared for the forthcoming consecrations and their fallout.

At the age of 82, Lefebvre first publicly announced his intention to consecrate bishops in a sermon at an ordination Mass in Écône on 29 June 1987, in which he declared that "Rome is in darkness, in the darkness of error", and that "the bishops of the whole world are following the false ideas of the Council with their ecumenism and liberalism". He concluded: "This is why it is likely that before I give account of my life to the good Lord, I shall have to consecrate some bishops".

== Discussions with the Holy See ==
Lefebvre and the Holy See engaged in dialogue and, on 5 May 1988, Lefebvre and Cardinal Joseph Ratzinger (the future Pope Benedict XVI) signed the text of an agreement intended to end the dispute and open the way for the consecration of a successor to Lefebvre. In the first, doctrinal, part of the document, Lefebvre, in his own name and on behalf of the SSPX, promised fidelity to the Catholic Church and to the Pope, accepted the doctrine contained in section 25 of the Second Vatican Council's Dogmatic Constitution Lumen gentium on the Church's magisterium, pledged a non-polemical attitude of communication with the Holy See on the problematic aspects of Vatican II, recognized the validity of the revised sacraments, and promised to respect the common discipline of the Church and her law. The second, legal part of the document envisaged that the SSPX would become a Society of Apostolic Life with certain exemptions, it would have the faculty to celebrate the Tridentine rites, a special commission including two members of the SSPX to resolve conflicts, and a member of the SSPX to be consecrated as a bishop.

This document was to be submitted to the Pope for his approval. However, Lefebvre quickly came to the view that he was being enticed into a trap. The very next day, he declared he was obliged in conscience to proceed, with or without papal approval, to ordain on 30 June a bishop to succeed him.

A further meeting took place in Rome on 24 May. Lefebvre was now promised that the Pope would appoint a bishop from among the members of the SSPX, chosen according to the normal procedures and that the consecration would take place on 15 August, at the close of the Marian year. In return, Lefebvre would have to request reconciliation with the Pope on the basis of the protocol of 5 May. Lefebvre requested in writing that the consecration of three bishops take place on 30 June and that the majority of the members of the special commission must be from the SSPX. On the Pope's instructions, Ratzinger replied on 30 May to Lefebvre concerning these requests, "[O]n the question of the commission, whose purpose was to favour reconciliation, not to make decisions, the Holy Father [i.e., the Pope] thought it best to keep to the agreement that Lefebvre had signed on 5 May"; on the question of the ordination of bishops, the Pope reiterated his readiness to speed up the usual process so as to nominate a member of the Society to be consecrated on 15 August, and Lefebvre was asked to provide the necessary information on candidates for this purpose, but, Ratzinger added, "Since you have announced again recently your intention to ordain three bishops on 30 June with or without the agreement of Rome, you must state clearly that you entrust yourself to the Holy Father's decision in full obedience".

== Consecration of four bishops ==
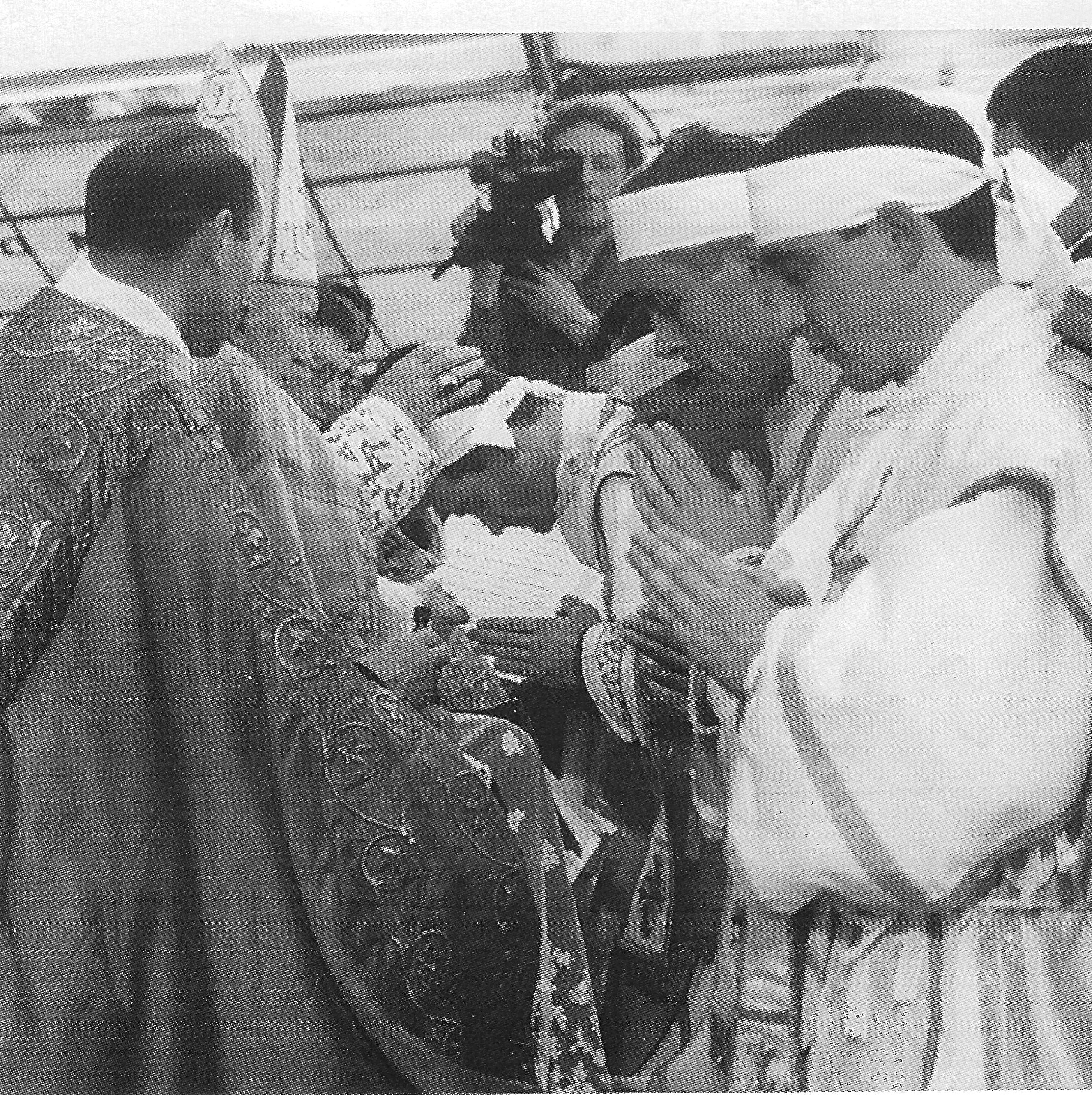
The Consecrations during the Mass

On 3 June, Lefebvre wrote from Écône, stating that he intended to proceed with the consecrations. On 9 June, the Pope replied to him with a personal letter, appealing to him not to proceed with a design that "would be seen as nothing other than a schismatic act, the theological and canonical consequences of which are known to you".

On 17 June, Cardinal Bernardin Gantin, Prefect of the Congregation for Bishops sent the proposed bishops a formal canonical warning that they would automatically incur the penalty of excommunication if they were ordained by Lefebvre without papal permission.

On 29 June, Ratzinger sent a telegram to Lefebvre to say that "For the love of Christ and His Church, the Holy Father asks you paternally and firmly to depart today for Rome, without proceeding on 30 June with the episcopal ordinations that you have announced".

On 30 June, Lefebvre consecrated four SSPX priests: Bernard Fellay, Bernard Tissier de Mallerais, Richard Williamson and Alfonso de Galarreta. A later SSPX account said that Bishop Antônio de Castro Mayer participated with his "crucial presence" and was "found at Archbishop Lefebvre's side", but did not specifically describe him as participating in the consecration ritual. However, another SSPX article says both Lefebvre and de Castro Mayer consecrated the bishops.

=== Episcopal lineage ===
As of July 2026, the lineage originating from the 1988 consecrations amounts to 16 bishops, out of whom 12 are alive. So far, 1 bishop has reconciled with the Holy See after automatic excommunication, while another was consecrated with papal approval. Six of them (in bold) are current SSPX bishops as of 2026.

- Marcel Lefebvre (died 1991)
  - **Alfonso de Galarreta**
    - **Marc Hanappier** (with Fellay acting as co-consecrator)
    - **Michael Goldade** (with Fellay acting as co-consecrator)
    - **Pascal Schreiber** (with Fellay acting as co-consecrator)
    - **Michel Poinsinet de Sivry** (with Fellay acting as co-consecrator)
  - **Bernard Fellay**
  - Bernard Tissier de Mallerais (died 2024)
    - Licínio Rangel (with de Galarreta and Williamson acting as co-consecrators) – later reconciled with Rome. (died 2002)
      - Fernando Arêas Rifan (consecrated by Darío Castrillón Hoyos, with Rangel acting as a co-consecrator) – with papal approval.
  - Richard Williamson (died 2025)
    - Jean-Michel Faure
    - Tomás de Aquino Ferreira da Costa (with Faure acting as a co-consecrator)
    - Gerardo Zendejas (with Faure and Ferreira da Costa acting as co-consecrators)
    - Giacomo Ballini
    - Paul Morgan (with Ballini acting as co-consecrator)
    - Michał Stobnicki

== Excommunications ==
Two hours after the consecration, the Holy See released a statement saying Lefebvre and the four bishops he consecrated had excommunicated themselves by defying papal authority and by ignoring warnings including a last-minute appeal from John Paul II.

On the following day, 1 July 1988, the Vatican's Congregation for Bishops issued a decree signed by Cardinal Bernardin Gantin, Prefect of the Congregation, declaring that Lefebvre, Fellay, Tissier de Mallerais, Williamson, de Galarreta, and de Castro Mayer had incurred automatic excommunication.

On 2 July, Pope John Paul II, in his apostolic letter Ecclesia Dei, condemned the Archbishop's action, The Pope stated that, since schism is defined in canon 751 of the 1983 Code of Canon Law as "withdrawal of submission to the Supreme Pontiff or from communion with the members of the Church subject to him", the consecration "constitute[d] a schismatic act". The Pope declared: "In performing such an act, notwithstanding the formal canonical warning sent to them by the Cardinal Prefect of the Congregation for Bishops on 17 June last, Mons. Lefebvre and the priests Bernard Fellay, Bernard Tissier de Mallerais, Richard Williamson, and Alfonso de Galarreta have incurred the grave penalty of excommunication envisaged by ecclesiastical law", a reference to canon 1382 of the 1983 Code of Canon Law.

Lefebvre declared that he had not withdrawn his submission to the Pope, and claimed that canons 1323 and 1324 of the Code absolved him of culpability because of the crisis in the Church.

Viewing Lefebvre's action as schismatic, a number of former members and supporters of the SSPX resigned or withdrew their support from the Society and joined the newly founded (and Vatican-approved) Priestly Fraternity of St. Peter.

== Lifting of excommunications ==
By a decree of 21 January 2009, issued in response to a request that Fellay made on behalf of all four bishops whom Lefebvre had consecrated, the Prefect of the Congregation for Bishops, by the power expressly granted to him by Pope Benedict XVI, remitted the automatic excommunication that the four bishops had thereby incurred, though notably Lefebvre's name was not included in the decree. The document also expressed the wish that this would be followed speedily by full communion of the whole of the Society of Saint Pius X with the Church, thus bearing witness, by the proof of visible unity, to true loyalty and true recognition of the Pope's Magisterium and authority.

Fellay, superior general of SSPX, issued a statement in which the society expressed its "filial gratitude to the Holy Father for this gesture which, beyond the Priestly Society of Saint Pius X, will benefit the whole Church", and that the "[SSPX] wishes always to be more able to help the pope to remedy the unprecedented crisis which presently shakes the Catholic world, and which Pope John Paul II had designated as a state of 'silent apostasy'".

Some expressed surprise at the favour that the Pope had thus shown to bishops holding such positions, with particular regard to Bishop Williamson, who was accused as a Holocaust denier. The inclusion of this bishop presented problems for Catholic-Jewish relations, culminating in the Chief Rabbinate of Israel temporarily severing ties with the Vatican in protest. On 19 March 2015 Williamson was excommunicated latae sententiae following his unauthorized ordination of Jean-Michel Faure as a bishop in Nova Friburgo, Brazil. This act, done without papal mandate, also resulted in Faure's excommunication, reflecting their rejection of Roman authorities.
