= Pascal Schreiber =

Swiss Traditionalist Catholic bishop (born 1972)

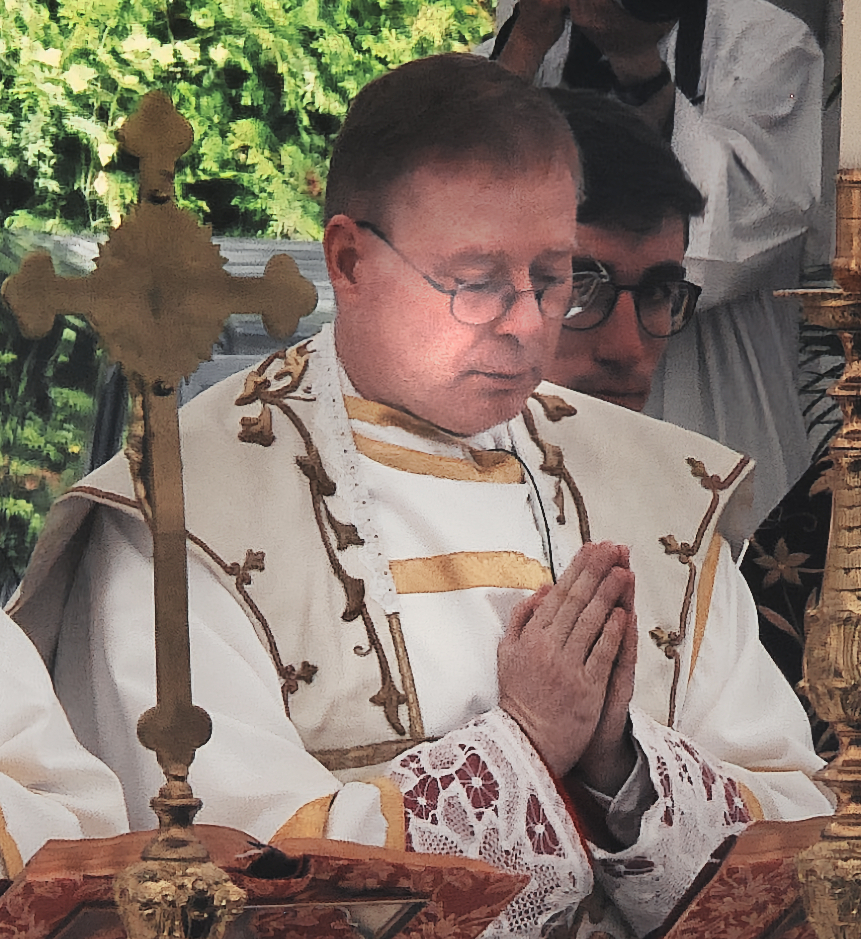
- Schreiber concelebrating Mass during his consecration, 2026
- Other post: Rector of The Sacred Heart Seminary in Zaitzkofen (2020 – present)

Orders
- Ordination: 29 June 1998 by Bernard Fellay
- Consecration: 1 July 2026 by Alfonso de Galarreta

Personal details
- Born: 31 July 1972 (age 54) Brugg, Switzerland
- Motto: Virgo fidelis (Latin for 'Virgin most faithful')

Pascal Schreiber (born 31 July 1972) is a Swiss Traditionalist Catholic bishop of the Society of St Pius X, a Traditionalist Catholic organization considered to be in schism by the Holy See.

He was consecrated a bishop without papal approval in the 2026 Écône consecrations, and was declared excommunicated.

== Career ==
Schreiber was born on 31 July 1972 in Brugg, Switzerland. He comes from a Catholic family with five children.

He studied at traditionalist seminaries in Zaitzkofen and Écône. In July 1998, he was ordained as a priest for the SSPX.

After his ordination, Schreiber did pastoral work in Germany and the French-speaking parts of Switzerland. In 2003, he became the director of a boys' high school in Mels. In 2005, he became the head of a girls' school in Wil, where he worked until 2014.

From 2014 to 2016, he worked as the treasurer for the Swiss district of the SSPX. He then became the superior (leader) of the Swiss district from 2016 to 2020. In 2020, he was named the rector (head) of the SSPX seminary in Zaitzkofen, Germany.

=== Bishop ===
On 26 May 2026, the SSPX announced that Schreiber was chosen to become a bishop. Pope Leo XIV did not agree to this choice. The Pope asked the SSPX not to consecrate him.

On 1 July 2026, Schreiber was consecrated as a bishop during a service in Écône, Switzerland by Alfonso de Galarreta, with Bernard Fellay acting as the sole co-consecrator.

Because he was consecrated without a papal mandate, the Holy See considers Schreiber automatically excommunicated. The SSPX does not agree with this excommunication.
