= Marc Hanappier =

French SSPX bishop (born 1990)

- Other post: Bishop of the Society of Saint Pius X (2026 – present)

Orders
- Ordination: 28 June 2013 by Bernard Tissier de Mallerais
- Consecration: 1 July 2026 by Alfonso de Galarreta

Personal details
- Born: 7 February 1990 (age 36) France
- Motto: Dignus est Agnus (Latin for 'Worthy is the Lamb')
- Coat of arms

Marc Hanappier (born 7 February 1990) is a French excommunicated Catholic bishop of the Society of St Pius X, a Traditionalist Catholic organization declared to be in schism from the Catholic Church by Pope Leo XIV.

He is the youngest of the six SSPX bishops, having been consecrated without papal approval, at the age of 36, alongside three others in the 2026 Écône consecrations.

== Early life ==
Hanappier was born in 1990 in France. He comes from a large Catholic family with ten children. Two of his brothers are also priests in the SSPX. One of his sisters is a traditionalist nun.

He studied at traditionalist seminaries in Flavigny-sur-Ozerain and Écône. In 2013, he was ordained as a priest for the SSPX.

== Career ==
After his ordination, Hanappier worked as a teacher in France. He taught at Étoile-du-Matin school in Bitche and Saint-Michel school in Châteauroux. Later, he spent one year in Scotland to improve his English and do religious work.

In 2020, he moved to the United States. He became a teacher of metaphysics and theology at the SSPX seminary in Dillwyn, Virginia.

=== Bishop ===
On 26 May 2026, the SSPX announced that Hanappier was chosen to become a bishop. Pope Leo XIV did not agree to this choice. The Pope asked the SSPX not to consecrate him.

On 1 July 2026, Hanappier was consecrated as a bishop during a service in Écône, Switzerland by Alfonso de Galarreta, with Bernard Fellay acting as the sole co-consecrator.

Because he was consecrated without a papal mandate, Hanappier was latae sententiae excommunicated. The SSPX does not agree with this excommunication.
