= Michel Poinsinet de Sivry =

French Traditionalist Catholic bishop (born 1984)

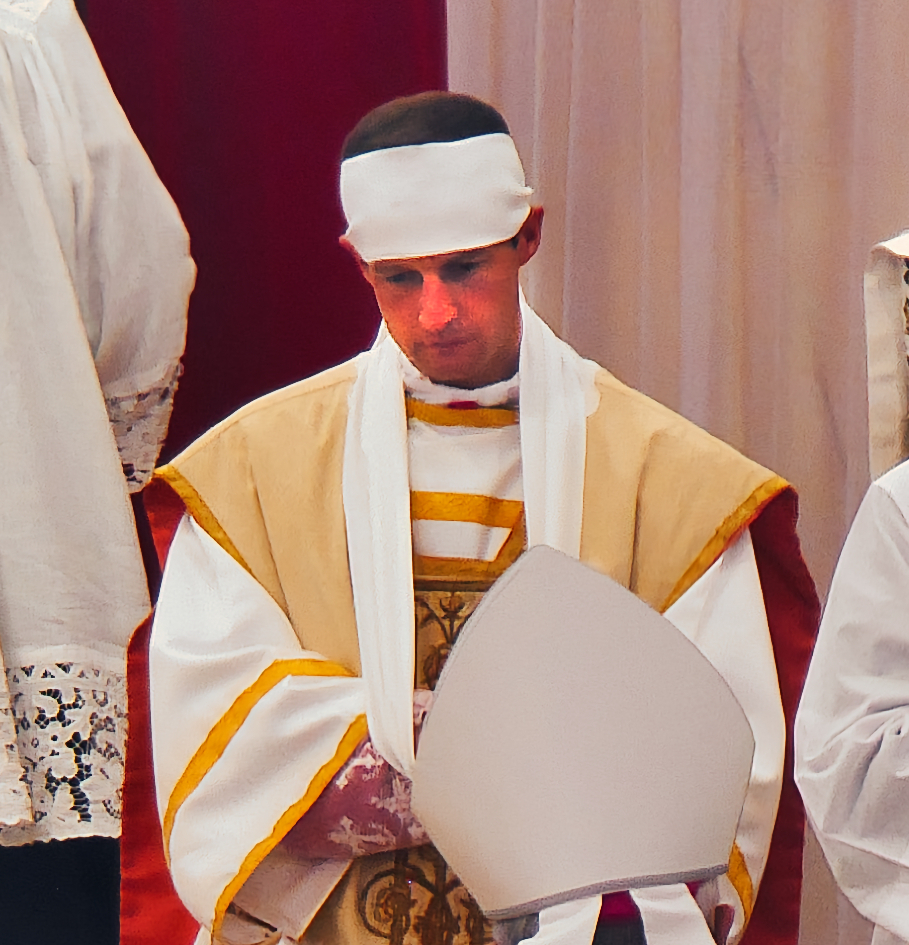
- Poinsinet during his consecration, 2026
- Other post: Superior of the FSSPX District of Benelux (2022 – present)

Orders
- Ordination: 27 June 2008 by Alfonso de Galarreta
- Consecration: 1 July 2026 by Alfonso de Galarreta

Personal details
- Born: 10 April 1984 (age 42) France
- Motto: Fides vincit mundum (Latin for 'Faith overcometh the world')
- Coat of arms

Michel Poinsinet de Sivry (born 10 April 1984) is a French Traditionalist Catholic bishop of the Society of St Pius X, a Traditionalist Catholic organization considered to be in schism by the Holy See.

He was consecrated a bishop by the Society of St Pius X in the 2026 Écône consecrations, and was declared excommunicated by the Apostolic See as the consecration did not have the permission of Pope Leo XIV.

== Early life ==
Poinsinet de Sivry was born in 1984 in France. He comes from a Catholic family with seven children.

He studied at traditionalist seminaries in Flavigny-sur-Ozerain and Écône. In 2008, he was ordained as a priest for the SSPX.

== Career ==
=== Priest ===
After his priestly ordination, Poinsinet de Sivry worked as a teacher and headmaster in France. He taught at Saint-Joseph-des-Carmes school in Montréal from 2008 to 2011. He was the headmaster of Saint-Louis School in Paris from 2011 to 2016. He then worked at Saint-Jean-Baptiste-de-La-Salle school in Camblain-l’Abbé until 2022.

In 2022, he became the superior (leader) of the Benelux district for the SSPX.

=== Bishop ===
On 26 May 2026, the SSPX announced that Poinsinet de Sivry was chosen to become a bishop. Pope Leo XIV did not agree to this choice, and ordered the SSPX not to consecrate him.

On 1 July 2026, Poinsinet de Sivry was consecrated as a bishop, along with three others, in Écône, Switzerland principally by Alfonso de Galarreta, with Bernard Fellay acting as the sole co-consecrator. Because he was consecrated without a papal mandate, the Apostolic See decreed Poinsinet de Sivry's automatic excommunication. The Society rejects the validity of this excommunication.
