= Alfonso de Galarreta =

Spanish-Argentine Traditionalist Catholic bishop (born 1957)

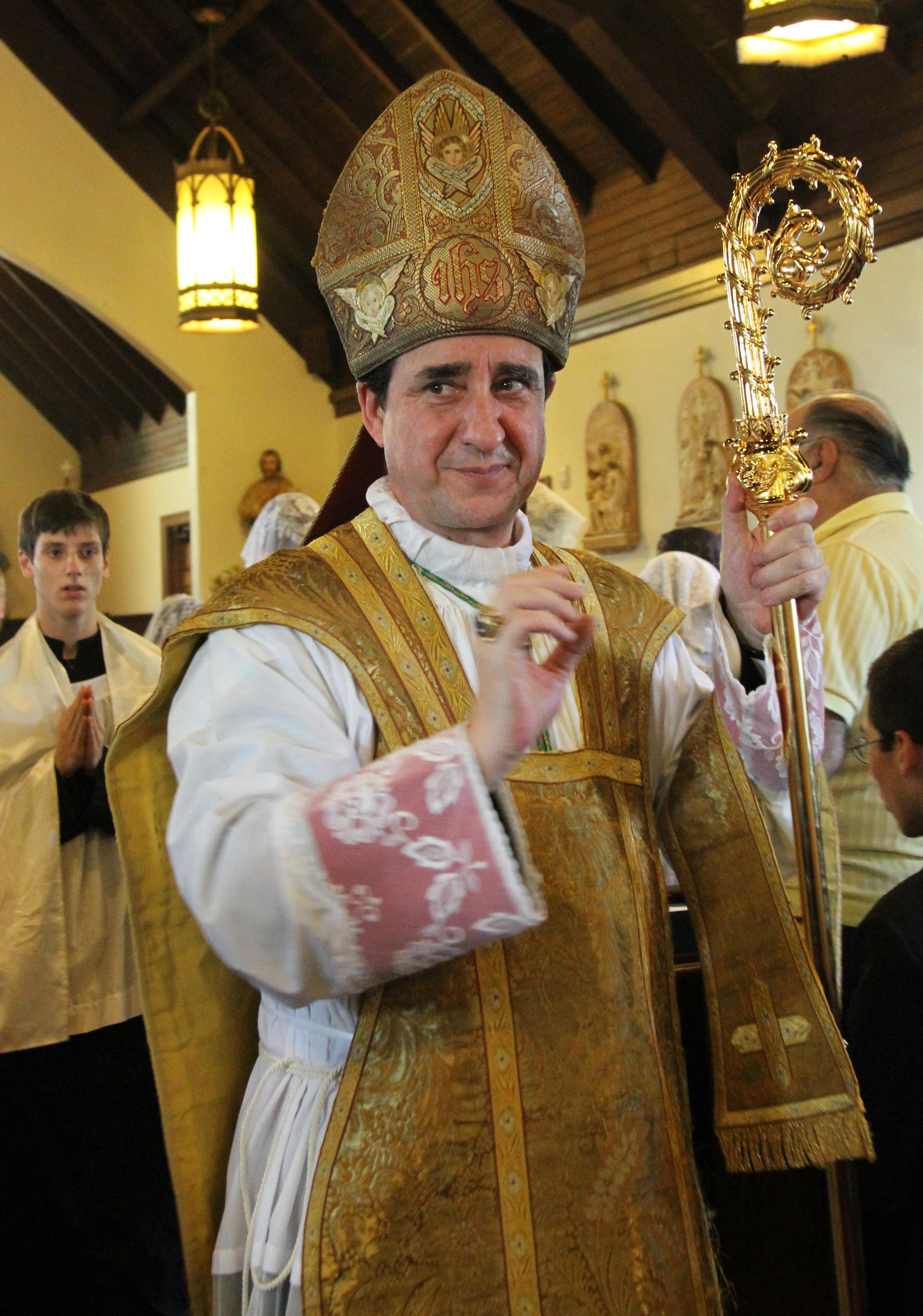
- Bishop Alfonso de Galarreta, circa 2011.
- Other post: Auxiliary Bishop of the Society of Saint Pius X (1988 – present)

Orders
- Ordination: 24 August 1980 by Marcel Lefebvre
- Consecration: 30 June 1988 by Marcel Lefebvre

Personal details
- Born: 14 January 1957 (age 69) Torrelavega, Spain
- Education: The International Seminary of Saint Pius X
- Motto: Omnia per Mariam (Latin for 'All by Mary')
- Coat of arms

Ordination history
History
Priestly ordination
- Ordained by: Marcel Lefebvre
- Date: 24 August 1980
- Place: La Rega, Argentina
Episcopal consecration
- Principal consecrator: Marcel Lefebvre
- Co-consecrators: Antônio de Castro Mayer
- Date: 30 June 1988
- Place: The International Seminary of Saint Pius X, Écône, Switzerland
Episcopal succession
Bishops consecrated by Alfonso de Galarreta as principal consecrator
- Pascal Schreiber: 1 July 2026
- Michael Goldade: 1 July 2026
- Michel Poinsinet de Sivry: 1 July 2026
- Marc Hanappier: 1 July 2026

Alfonso de Galarreta Genua (born 14 January 1957) is a Spanish-born Argentine Traditionalist Catholic bishop who has served as an Auxiliary Bishop of the Society of Saint Pius X (SSPX) since 1988. Since 2018, de Galarreta has served as the First Assistant of the Society of Saint Pius X, working under the direction of the Superior General Davide Pagliarani. Concurrently, de Galarreta has been the President of the SSPX–Vatican Commission since 2009, which directs the Society's correspondence with the Holy See.

During the pontificate of Pope Benedict XVI in 2009, the Holy See officially declared the remission of the automatic excommunications of de Galarreta and the three SSPX bishops stemming from the 1988 Écône consecrations.

In 2026, the Holy See decreed another automatic excommunication of de Galarreta from the Catholic Church for consecrating four bishops without a papal mandate against the direct orders of Pope Leo XIV.

== 1988 Écône consecrations ==
In June 1988, Archbishop Marcel Lefebvre announced his intention to consecrate de Galarreta and three other priests (Bernard Fellay, Bernard Tissier de Mallerais, and Richard Williamson) as bishops. Lefebvre did not have a pontifical mandate for these consecrations (i.e. permission from the pope), normally required by Canon 1382 of the 1983 Code of Canon Law. On 17 June 1988 Cardinal Bernardin Gantin, prefect of the Congregation for Bishops, sent the four priests a formal canonical warning that he would automatically incur the penalty of excommunication if they were to be consecrated by Lefebvre without papal permission.

On 30 June 1988 de Galarreta and the three other priests were consecrated bishop by Archbishop Lefebvre and Bishop Antônio de Castro Mayer. On 1 July 1988 Cardinal Gantin issued a declaration stating that Lefebvre, de Castro Mayer, de Galarreta, and the three other newly-ordained bishops "have incurred ipso facto the excommunication latae sententiae reserved to the Apostolic See".

On 2 July 1988, Pope John Paul II issued the motu proprio Ecclesia Dei, in which he reaffirmed the excommunication, and described the consecration as an act of "disobedience to the Roman pontiff in a very grave matter and of supreme importance for the unity of the Church", and that "such disobedience – which implies in practice the rejection of the Roman primacy – constitutes a schismatic act".

The SSPX denied the legal validity of the excommunication, saying that the consecrations were necessary due to a moral and theological crisis in the Catholic Church and thus continued to operate regardless.

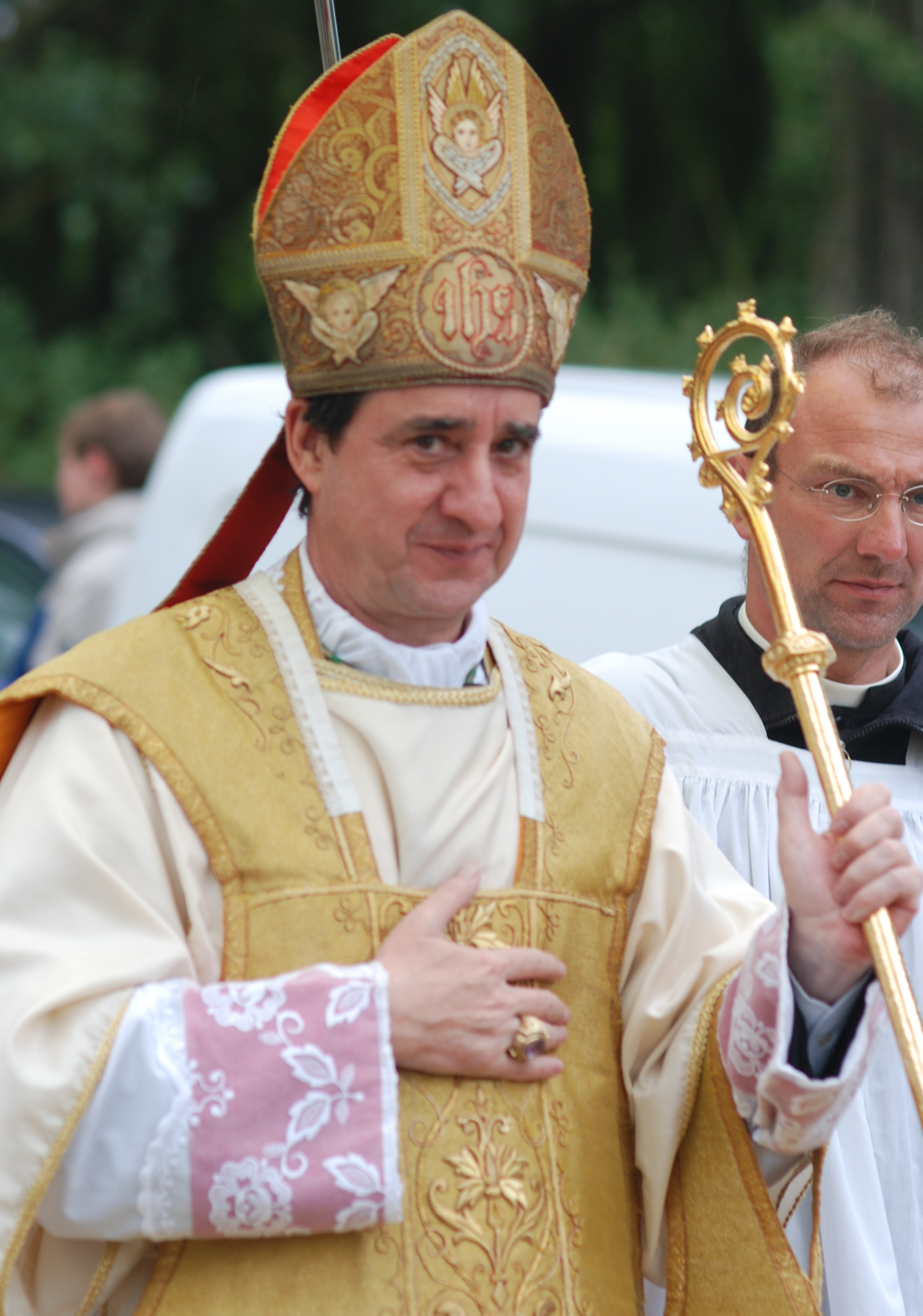
de Galarreta in 2011

In 2009, the excommunications were remitted by Pope Benedict XVI. The canonical situation of the four bishops thus became the same as that of the other clergy of the Society, who are suspended a divinis.

== 2026 Écône consecrations ==
For principally consecrating four bishops against the explicit orders of Pope Leo XIV, and doing so without a papal mandate, In July 2026, the Holy See decreed that de Galaretta and Bishop Bernard Fellay were automatically excommunicated from the Catholic Church.
