= 2026 Écône consecrations =

2026 bishop consecrations in Switzerland

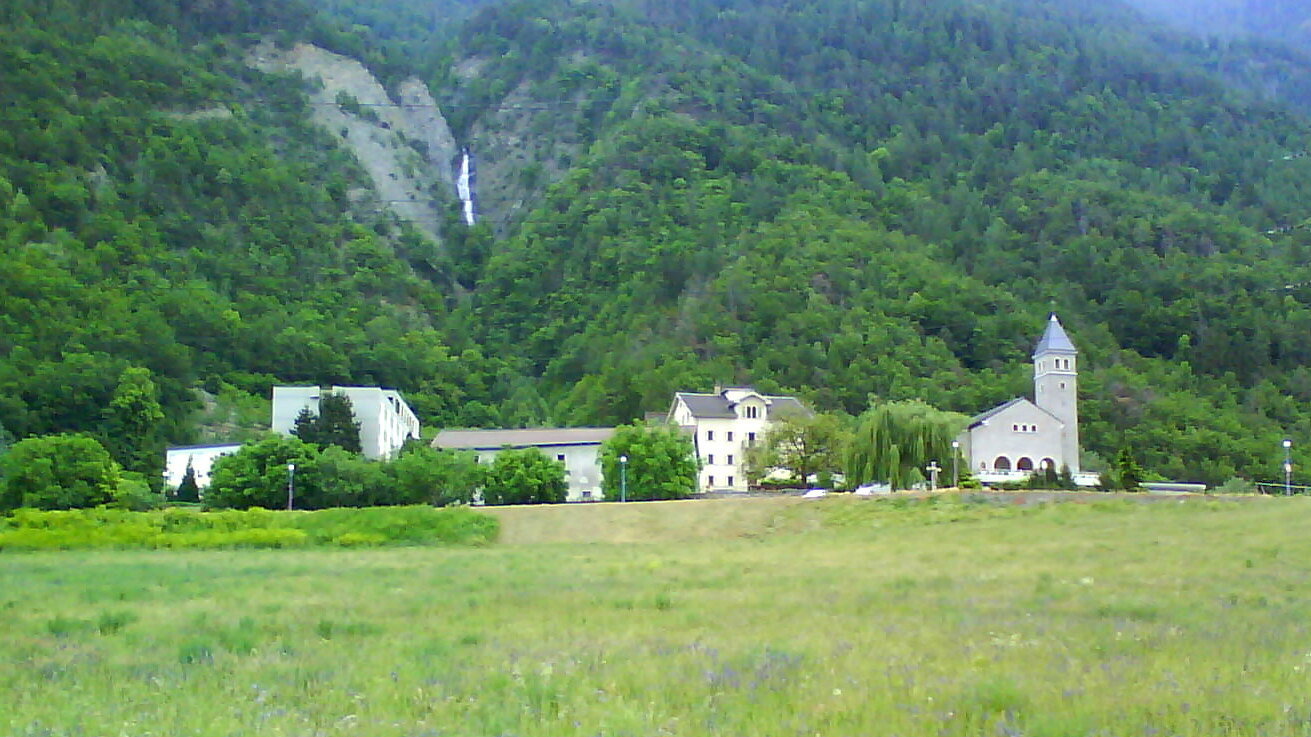
Écône, Switzerland, where the consecrations took place

On 1 July 2026, members of the Society of Saint Pius X (SSPX) in Écône, Switzerland, consecrated four bishops against the orders of Pope Leo XIV, causing the Pope to declare a schism between the SSPX and the Catholic Church.

The consecrations were performed by the SSPX Bishop Alfonso de Galarreta, and assisted by Bishop Bernard Fellay. The four men consecrated were Michael Goldade, Marc Hanappier, Michel Poinsinet de Sivry, and Pascal Schreiber. The SSPX denies being in schism.

SSPX was founded in opposition to the Second Vatican Council's reforms, including the use of vernacular language instead of Latin during Mass. Its founder, Marcel Lefebvre, previously consecrated bishops without papal consent in 1988. This led to the participants at the time, along with SSPX adherents, being declared excommunicated from the church.

The Holy See warned in advance that the 2026 consecrations would constitute a "schismatic act" under canon law. The consecrations took place despite this warning, and as a result the Holy See declared that the bishops involved in it, the priests of the SSPX, and any laity who "formally adhere" to the SSPX were excommunicated. (Note: Under canon 1364 §1 of the 1983 Code of Canon Law, schism incurs automatic excommunication. For lay faithful, this applies only to those who "formally adhere" to SSPX, per a 1996 test with two elements (internal and external): the internal one is freely choosing loyalty to the Lefebvrist movement over obedience to the Pope, and the external one is shown by exclusively attending SSPX liturgies rather than those of the Catholic Church. Occasional attendance alone does not meet this standard. All SSPX clergy are considered to satisfy both elements automatically through their ministry within the movement.) The SSPX disputes these excommunications and has announced it will challenge them legally.

== Background ==
The Society of Saint Pius X (SSPX) was founded in 1970 by Archbishop Marcel Lefebvre as a pious union and was approved ad experimentum by Bishop François Charrière of Fribourg. The SSPX opposed the liturgical and doctrinal reforms of the Second Vatican Council, such as the shift away from the Latin Tridentine Mass in favor of the Mass of Paul VI.

On 6 May 1975 Bishop Pierre Mamie, who had succeeded Charrière, suppressed the SSPX with the support of the Sacred Congregation for Religious; appeals against Mamie's decision were rejected by the Apostolic Signatura. The SSPX continued to operate in spite its canonical suppression. In 1976, Lefebvre was suspended a divinis for ordaining SSPX seminarians without the approval of the local bishop.

On 30 June 1988, Lefebvre consecrated four men as bishops without the approval of Pope John Paul II, citing a "state of necessity". The men consecrated were Bernard Fellay, Bernard Tissier de Mallerais, Richard Williamson, and Alfonso de Galarreta; Lefebvre was also assisted by Bishop Antônio de Castro Mayer. Two hours after the ceremony, the Holy See declared that Lefebvre, de Castro Mayer and the four consecrated bishops had incurred automatic excommunication. The Pope subsequently issued the motu proprio Ecclesia Dei, formally describing the act as schismatic.

In January 2009, Pope Benedict XVI lifted the 1988 excommunications on the four consecrated bishops, although the SSPX did not get canonical recognition and continued to operate in an irregular status. Over the next decade, Pope Francis attempted to improve relations with the SSPX by allowing its priests to administer confession and assist at Catholic marriages. However, in 2021, Francis introduced new restrictions on the Tridentine Mass, exacerbating tensions with the group.

Prior to the July 2026 consecrations, the SSPX had only two active bishops, Bernard Fellay and Alfonso de Galarreta, both almost 70 years old. Of the bishops consecrated in 1988, Tissier de Mallerais had died in October 2024 after a fall at the Écône seminary, while Richard Williamson, who had been expelled from the SSPX in 2012, had died in January 2025.

According to the SSPX, their two living bishops had jurisdiction over 751 priests, 264 seminarians, 145 religious brothers, 88 oblates, and 250 religious sisters of 50 nationalities.

== Announcement ==
On 2 February 2026, the Superior General of the SSPX, Father Davide Pagliarani, announced confirmation of plans to proceed with consecrating bishops for the society on 1 July 2026. The decision was taken, he said, in harmony with the unanimous advice of his council, and was publicly announced on the feast of the Purification of the Blessed Virgin Mary during a ceremony he presided over at the International Seminary of Saint-Curé d'Ars in Flavigny-sur-Ozerain, France. Pagliarani said the move followed letters he had sent to the Vatican in August and November 2025 that went unanswered.

On 12 February 2026, Pagliarani met in Rome with Cardinal Víctor Manuel Fernández, prefect of the Dicastery for the Doctrine of the Faith. The dicastery stated its openness to begin renewed doctrinal talks with the SSPX, while warning that proceeding with the planned consecrations would end any prospect of dialogue. On 18 February 2026, the SSPX published a letter from Pagliarani to Fernández confirming that 1 July would stand as the date for the new episcopal consecrations, citing unresolved disagreement over the Second Vatican Council.

On 16 March 2026, the SSPX's Italian district gave to each of the Italian bishops a volume titled Al servizio della Chiesa ("At the service of the Church"), setting out the society's reasons for the planned episcopal consecrations.

== Warnings from the Holy See ==
On 13 May 2026, Cardinal Víctor Manuel Fernández issued a statement on behalf of the Holy Office warning that the planned consecrations would constitute "a schismatic act" and that "formal adherence to schism constitutes a grave offense against God and entails the excommunication established by the law of the Church", quoting the 1988 letter Ecclesia Dei. The following day, the SSPX published a "Declaration of Catholic Faith", describing it as containing the "minimum necessary to be in communion" with the Catholic Church, while reiterating its criticisms of post–Vatican II teaching.

On 16 June 2026, speaking to journalists at Castel Gandolfo, Pope Leo XIV said that while a final appeal to the society was being prepared, the decision to proceed remained "their choice", and added: "If they make that choice, I am sorry, but we must move forward". On 24 June, the SSPX issued an open letter to the Pope and the College of Cardinals reaffirming its position and confirming it would proceed with the consecrations.

=== Final papal appeal ===
Later on 30 June 2026, the eve of the scheduled consecration ceremony, the Pope published a letter to Pagliarani making a final appeal for the consecrations to be called off, describing them as a "sin of extreme gravity" and writing, "I plead with you and ask you with all my heart: please turn back!" The Pope warned that the consecrations would deprive the SSPX faithful of "the licit, and in some cases, even valid reception of the sacraments". (Note: For the sacraments of Matrimony and Penance to be valid, ecclesiastical jurisdiction given by the Pope is needed.)

Pagliarani replied the same afternoon, thanking the Pope for his concern but maintaining that the consecrations would not constitute schism, writing: "Far be it from us to separate ourselves from the Roman Church. We desire, on the contrary, to serve her by means that are extraordinary".

== Consecration ==
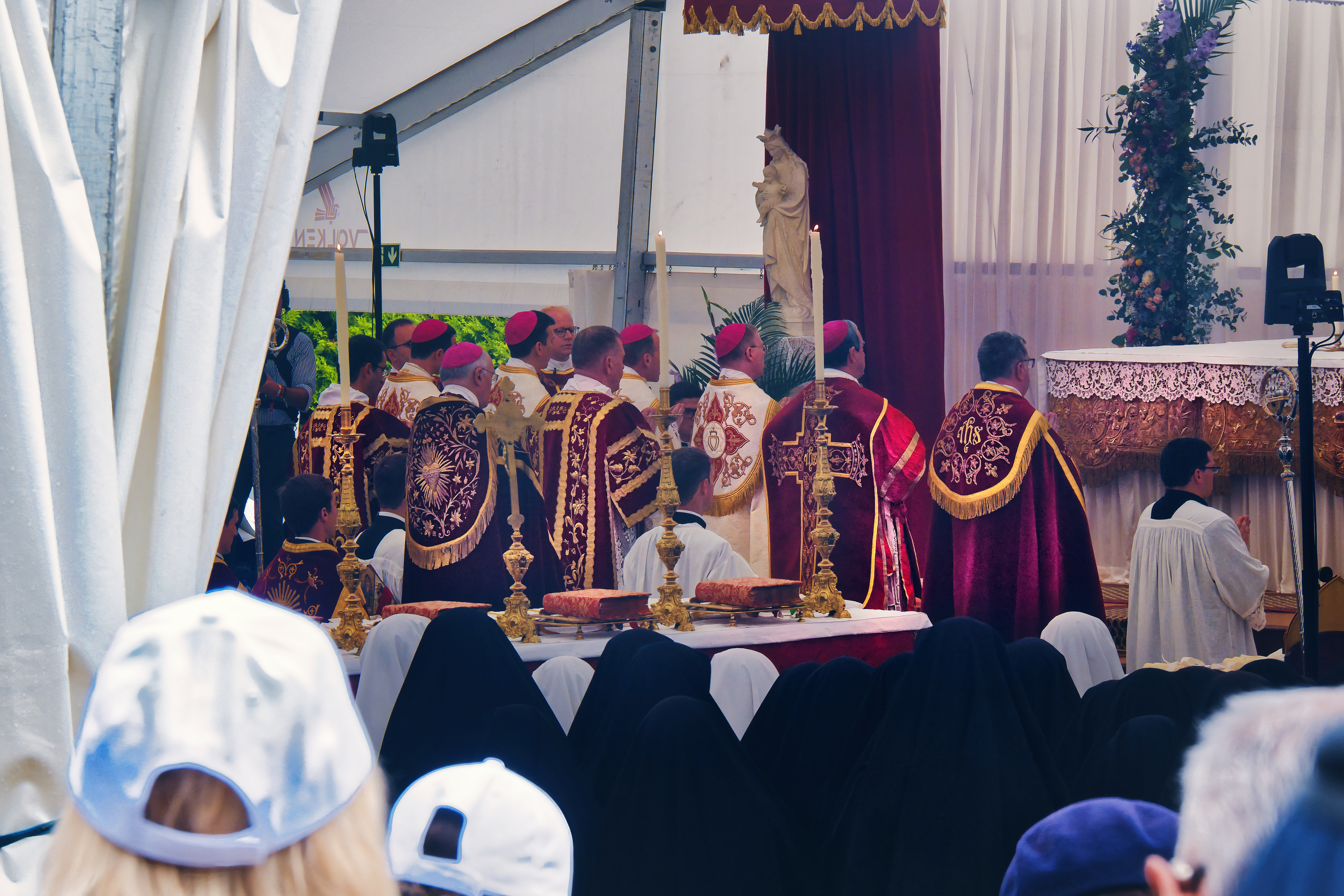
SSPX bishops and clergy during the Mass of Consecration

The consecration ceremony was held on 1 July 2026, in the meadow at Écône where the 1988 consecrations had taken place. The throne of the main consecrator was the one Lefebvre had used in 1988, and the four new bishops' vestments were the ones used by the bishops ordained in 1988. The ceremony took place exactly 38 years after the Vatican had declared the 1988 consecrations.

Bishop Alfonso de Galarreta acted as the principal consecrator, with Bernard Fellay being the co-consecrator; de Galarreta and Fellay were the last two remaining bishops of the original four consecrated in 1988.

During the Liturgy of Ordination that calls for a papal mandate, Pagliarani invoked the same "state of necessity" argument Lefebvre had used in 1988 and called for Lefebvre's canonization; he also said the authorities of the Church since the Second Vatican Council had been "imbued with a spirit contrary to the faith" and had "acted against holy tradition". (Note: The Holy See had previously rejected that argument: in a 1996 explanatory note, the Pontifical Council for Legislative Texts stated that "there is never a necessity to ordain Bishops contrary to the will of the Roman Pontiff".) During the Communion of the principal consecrator, a downpour fell on the crowd, accompanied by thunder and lightning; the rain subsided after about 20 minutes. Due to the rain, Communion was not distributed immediately. The clergy and laity chanted the rosary together while waiting for the rain to stop, after which Communion was distributed.

The consecration drew an estimated 15,000 faithful and 1,300 priests and religious from around the world; registration had been made mandatory for those attending events at the seminary between 29 June and 2 July 2026. The society broadcast the ceremony live with audio commentary in six languages. A solemn procession to an altar erected beneath a tent opened the ceremony, with priests and religious sisters of the society seated in the front rows and many families in attendance, some following the rite on large video screens. Participants were able to purchase commemorative merchandise, including a boxed set of wines labelled "Cuvée des Sacres" ('Consecration cuvée'). Guests included members of New Force, an Italian neo-fascist political party, and National Future, a new far-right organization.

=== Bishops consecrated ===
The four men consecrated were:

- Pascal Schreiber of Aargau, Switzerland, a rector of the Herz Jesu (Sacred Heart) Seminary (Zaitzkofen, Germany)
- Michael Goldade of North Dakota, United States, a rector of Saint Thomas Aquinas Seminary (Dillwyn, Virginia)
- Michel Poinsinet de Sivry of France, superior of the Benelux District
- Marc Hanappier of France, a professor at Saint Thomas Aquinas Seminary (Dillwyn, Virginia)

== Declaration of schism and excommunications ==
On 2 July, the day after the consecration, the Dicastery for the Doctrine of the Faith formally decreed the excommunication of the two bishop-consecrators (de Galarreta and Fellay), the newly ordained four bishops, all SSPX priests, and all lay Catholics with formal adherence to the SSPX; the decree was accompanied by an explanatory note. Furthermore, the Dicastery declared that the sacraments to be administered by the Society's ministers are illicit, and the Sacrament of Reconciliation ministered and marriages assisted by them are invalid.

Under canon 1382 of the 1983 Code of Canon Law, a bishop who consecrates another bishop without a papal mandate, and the person who receives that consecration, incur automatic (latae sententiae) excommunication.

In the following days, multiple diocesan bishops in the United States issued statements towards SSPX laity reminding them that formal adherence to schism is a grave matter and assuring them that they would be welcomed if they returned to communion with the Catholic Church.

== Reception and aftermath ==
Catholic commentators characterized the consecrations as a renewed act of schism comparable to those in 1988. Commentators noted that the six bishops involved were excommunicated under the same provision applied then. Within the SSPX community, jokes such as "Party like it's 1988" and "1988 copy paste" were spread, indicating that the excommunications were not perceived as a serious threat to the SSPX. Responses from figures outside the SSPX included both praise and criticism.

The Vatican's response was more severe than expected: the bishops' excommunication had been anticipated, but the extension to lay followers was "a surprise to many".

On 3 July 2026, Davide Pagliarani, the leader of the SSPX, addressed a letter to Pope Leo XIV defending the consecrations. In this letter, he affirmed that the SSPX considers itself faithful to the Church, while dismissing the Holy See's response to the consecrations as "objectively unjust and invalid". He argued: "What the Society of Saint Pius X has done, and will continue to do, is nothing other than an extraordinary initiative for the salvation of souls, amidst the doctrinal and moral confusion into which the church is plunged".

Later, on 8 July 2026, the SSPX released a statement saying they were "also ready to obey the Pope in all things", they added however, "provided that his orders do not imply adherence to the modernist doctrines of Vatican II and the post-conciliar period".

On 11 July 2026, SSPX appealed to the Dicastery for the Doctrine of the Faith against the excommunication decree.

=== Evaluation of the magnitude of the schism ===
The resulting schism has become the Catholic Church's largest in at least 156 years, after the Old Catholic schism that followed the First Vatican Council in 1870. Although the Society does not keep full records on its laity who attend their chapels, the SSPX have reprinted estimates that they number between 300,000 and 600,000; other estimates place the number closer to 100,000.

The National Public Radio described the incident as "the largest internal crisis" for Pope Leo XIV's papacy. SSPX members who spoke to Newsweek generally predicted that the excommunications would rally existing members and strengthen the convictions of SSPX leadership, rather than discourage or drive them away. One interviewed church organizer at an SSPX chapel in the United States anticipated about a dozen out of 300 regular Sunday attendees would leave due to the excommunications.

== See also ==
- Papal supremacy
- Ad Apostolorum Principis § Illegal consecrations
- Dialogue between the Holy See and the Society of Saint Pius X
