= Schierling =

- Municipality
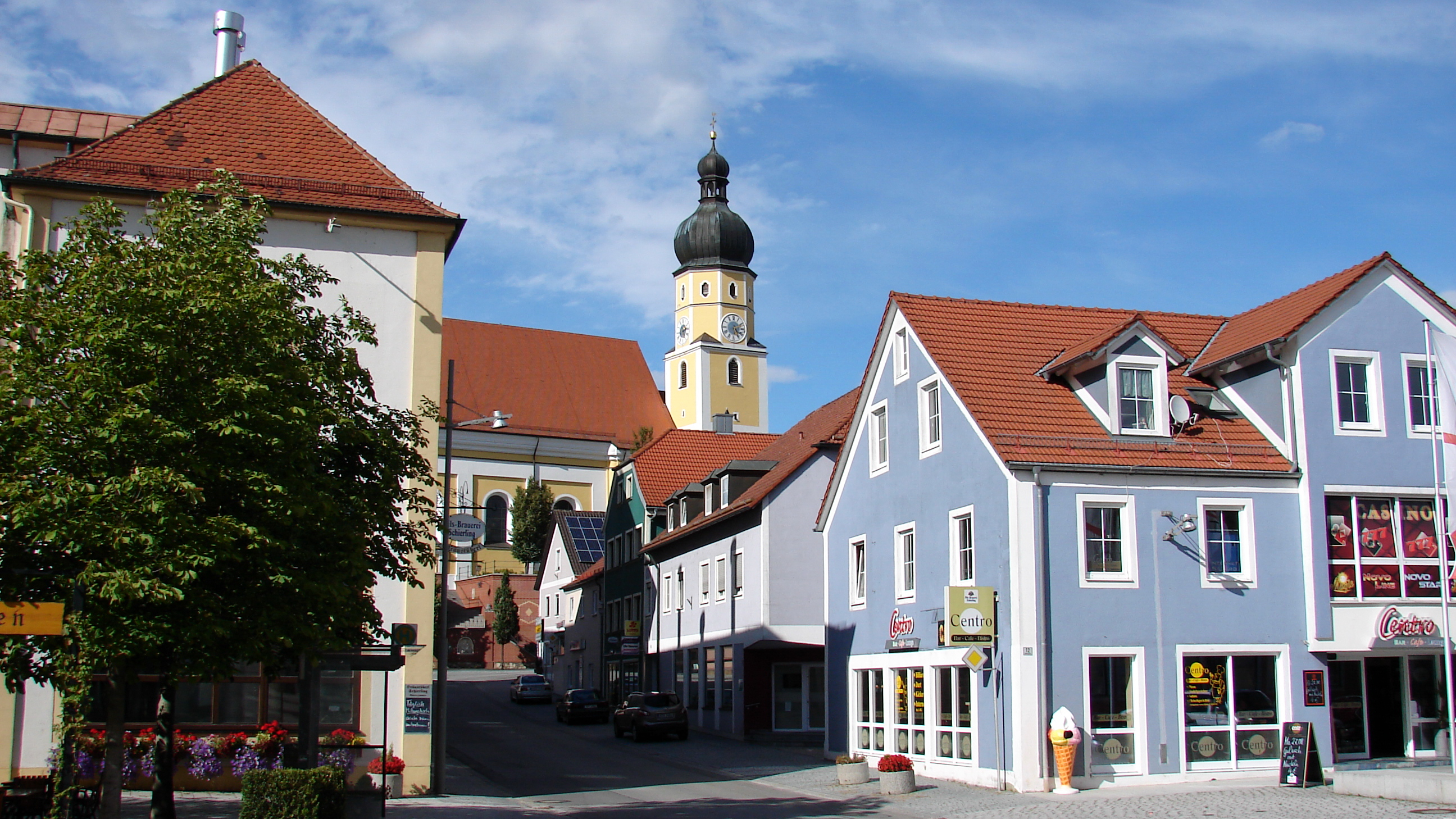
- Town square with the Church of Saints Peter and Paul

- Coat of arms

- Location of Schierling within Regensburg district
- Interactive map of Schierling
- Location within Germany Location within Bavaria
- Coordinates: 48°50′05″N 12°08′23″E
- Country: Germany
- State: Bavaria
- Admin. region: Oberpfalz
- District: Regensburg
- Subdivisions: 16 Ortsteile

Government
  - Mayor (2020–26): Christian Kiendl (CSU)

Area
  - Total: 77.42 km^{2} (29.89 sq mi)
- Elevation: 381 m (1,250 ft)

Population (2025-12-31)
  - Total: 8,306
  - Density: 107.3/km^{2} (277.9/sq mi)
- Time zone: UTC+01:00 (CET)
  - Summer (DST): UTC+02:00 (CEST)
- Postal codes: 84069
- Dialling codes: 09451
- Vehicle registration: R
- Website: www.schierling.de

Schierling (German pronunciation: [ˈʃiːɐ̯lɪŋ]) is a municipality in the district of Regensburg in Bavaria, Germany.

The municipality is an important industrial location and the southernmost in the Upper Palatinate.

At the gates of Schierling, Napoleon and his allies defeated the Austrians in the Battle of Eckmühl. As early as the time of Otto the Great, he moved into his headquarters in Schierling during the siege of Regensburg on the Via Claudia Augusta, the road built by the Romans and named after their emperor Augustus.
