= Richard Williamson =

English excommunicated Catholic bishop (1940–2025)

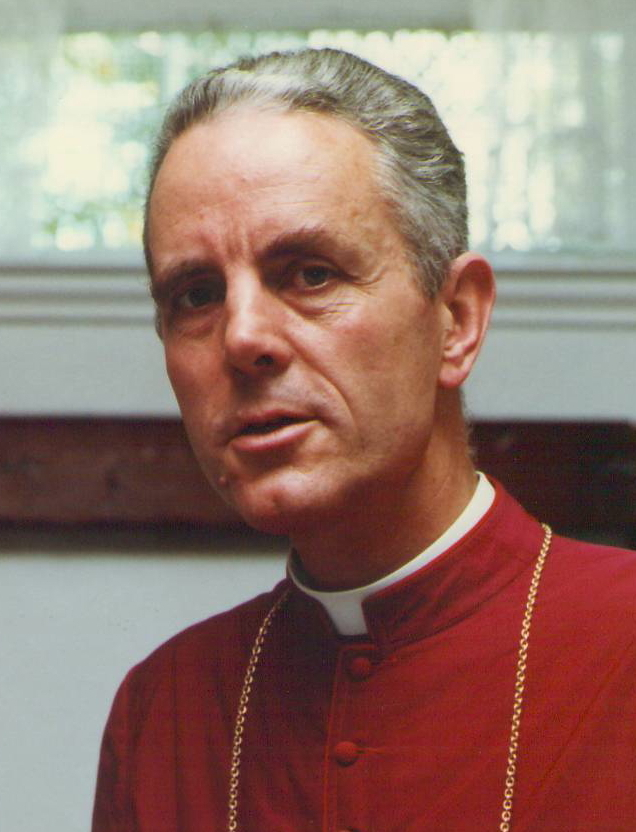
- Williamson in 1991
- Previous post: Auxiliary Bishop of the Society of Saint Pius X (1988 – 2012)

Orders
- Ordination: 29 June 1976 by Marcel Lefebvre
- Consecration: 30 June 1988 by Marcel Lefebvre

Personal details
- Born: Richard Nelson Williamson; 8 March 1940 London, England
- Died: 29 January 2025 (aged 84) Margate, Kent, England
- Denomination: Roman Catholic
- Education: Winchester College, University of Cambridge, International Seminary of Saint Pius X
- Motto: Fidelis inveniatur

Ordination history
History
Priestly ordination
- Ordained by: Marcel Lefebvre
- Date: 29 June 1976
- Place: The International Seminary of Saint Pius X, Écône, Switzerland
Episcopal consecration
- Principal consecrator: Marcel Lefebvre
- Co-consecrators: Antônio de Castro Mayer
- Date: 30 June 1988
- Place: The International Seminary of Saint Pius X, Écône, Switzerland
Episcopal succession
Bishops consecrated by Richard Williamson as principal consecrator
- Jean-Michel Faure: 19 March 2015
- Tomás de Aquino Ferreira da Costa: 19 March 2016
- Gerardo Zendejas: 11 May 2017
- Giacomo Ballini: 14 January 2021
- Paul Morgan: 14 February 2022
- Michał Stobnicki: 15 August 2022
- Styles
- Reference style: His Excellency, The Most Reverend
- Spoken style: Your Excellency
- Religious style: Bishop

Richard Nelson Williamson (8 March 1940 – 29 January 2025) was an English traditionalist Catholic bishop, conspiracy theorist and Holocaust denier who was twice excommunicated from the Catholic Church. He was for many years a member of the Society of Saint Pius X (SSPX).

Williamson opposed the changes in the Church brought about by the Second Vatican Council. In 1988, he was one of four SSPX priests consecrated as bishops by Archbishop Marcel Lefebvre, for which Pope John Paul II declared all parties had incurred ipso facto automatic excommunication. The validity of the excommunication has always been denied by the SSPX, who, citing canon law, argue that the consecrations were permissible due to a crisis in the Catholic Church. The excommunications, including that of Williamson, were lifted on 21 January 2009, but a suspension from ministry remained in force.

Immediately afterward, Swedish television broadcast an interview recorded earlier at the SSPX seminary in Zaitzkofen, Bavaria. Therein, Williamson expressed his belief that no more than 200,000 to 300,000 Jews were killed during the Holocaust and that Nazi Germany did not use gas chambers. Based upon these statements, he was charged with and convicted of Holocaust denial by the district court of Regensburg, Germany. The Holy See declared that Pope Benedict XVI had been unaware of Williamson's views when he lifted his excommunication, and that Williamson would remain suspended until he unequivocally and publicly distanced himself from his stated position. In 2010, Williamson was convicted of incitement in a German court in relation to those views; the conviction was later vacated on appeal. He was convicted again in a retrial in early 2013. Williamson appealed again, but his appeal was rejected.

After a number of incidents—including calling for the resignation of Bernard Fellay as superior general of the SSPX, refusal to stop publishing his weekly email newsletter, and an unauthorised visit to Brazil—Williamson was expelled from the SSPX in 2012. Afterwards, Williamson consecrated Jean-Michel Faure, Tomás de Aquino Ferreira da Costa, and Gerardo Zendejas as bishops in 2015, 2016, and 2017. Upon the first of the three consecrations, he was again automatically excommunicated from the Catholic Church.

== Early life and ordination ==
Richard Nelson Williamson was born on 8 March 1940 in Hampstead, London, England. He was the second of three sons born to Helen Nelson, a Paris-born woman with American parents, and her husband John Blackburn Williamson, a manager at Marks & Spencer. He attended Downsend School in Surrey before winning a scholarship to Winchester College. His family temporarily relocated to Leicestershire during the London Blitz. He then studied at Clare College, Cambridge, graduating in 1961 with a degree in English literature. Upon graduating, he worked as a journalist in Wales, and then returned to teach at his old school, Downsend, in 1963. He subsequently went to Ghana, where he also taught. When he returned to England in 1965, Williamson taught at St Paul's School in London.

Williamson, raised nominally Anglican, converted to the Catholic Church in 1971. After a few months as a postulant with the Oratorians of Brompton Oratory, he left. He became a member of the Society of Saint Pius X, a traditionalist Catholic faction founded in 1970 by Archbishop Marcel Lefebvre in protest against what Lefebvre saw as the liberalism of the Second Vatican Council. In common with other traditionalists, Williamson opposed the changes in the Catholic Church following the Second Vatican Council. He saw the changes as being unacceptably liberal and modernistic, and as being destructive to the Church. Among the changes he opposed were the Church's increased openness to other Christian denominations and other religions, and changes in the forms of Catholic worship such as the general replacement of the Tridentine Mass with the Mass of Paul VI. Williamson criticised Pope John Paul II, to whom he attributed a "weak grasp of Catholicism". Williamson held that the SSPX was not schismatic, but rather was composed of true Catholics who were keeping the "complete Roman Catholic apostolic faith".

Williamson entered the International Seminary of Saint Pius X at Écône, Switzerland, and in 1976 he was ordained a priest by Lefebvre against Vatican orders which led to Lefebvre being suspended a divinis by the Vatican. Williamson subsequently moved to the United States, where he was the rector of St. Thomas Aquinas Seminary in Ridgefield, Connecticut from 1983 when he was appointed to replace Donald Sanborn, and continued in the position when the seminary moved to Winona, Minnesota in 1988, serving until 2003.

== Consecration and excommunication ==
In June 1988, Archbishop Marcel Lefebvre announced his intention to consecrate Williamson and three other priests (Bernard Fellay, Bernard Tissier de Mallerais, and Alfonso de Galarreta) as bishops. On 17 June 1988, Cardinal Bernardin Gantin, prefect of the Congregation for Bishops, sent the four priests a formal canonical warning that they would automatically incur the penalty of excommunication if they were to be consecrated by Lefebvre without papal permission. Williamson and the three other priests were nonetheless consecrated bishop on 30 June 1988 by Lefebvre and Antônio de Castro Mayer. The next day, Cardinal Bernardin Gantin issued a declaration stating that Lefebvre, de Castro Mayer, Williamson, and the three other newly ordained bishops "have incurred ipso facto the excommunication latae sententiae reserved to the Apostolic See". On 2 July 1988, Pope John Paul II issued the motu proprio Ecclesia Dei, in which he reaffirmed the excommunication and described the consecration as an act of "disobedience to the Roman pontiff in a very grave matter and of supreme importance for the unity of the Church", and that "such disobedience – which implies in practice the rejection of the Roman primacy — constitutes a schismatic act".

== Bishop with controversial views ==
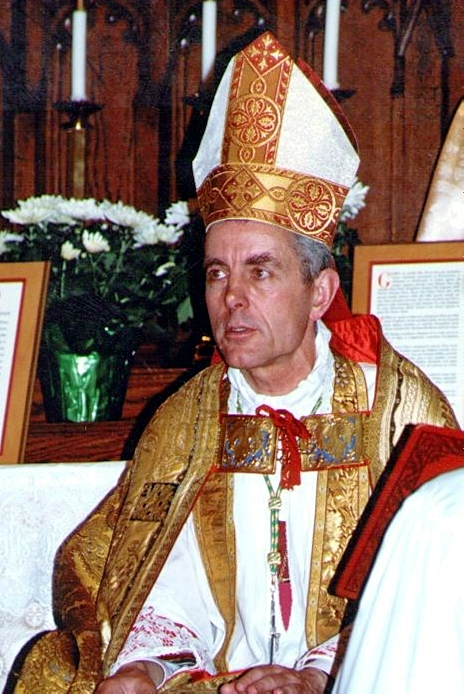
Bishop Williamson in 1991

After his episcopal consecration, Williamson remained rector of St. Thomas Aquinas Seminary in Winona, Minnesota. He performed various episcopal functions, including confirmations and ordinations. In 1991, he assisted in the consecration of Licínio Rangel as bishop for the Priestly Society of St. John Mary Vianney after the death of its founder, Antônio de Castro Mayer. In 2003, Williamson was appointed rector of the Seminary of Our Lady Co-Redemptrix in La Reja, Argentina and according to The Guardian became a cult figure amongst the far-right seminarians. In 2006, he ordained two priests and seven deacons in Warsaw, Poland, for the Ukrainian Greek Catholic Priestly Society of Saint Josaphat (SSJK).

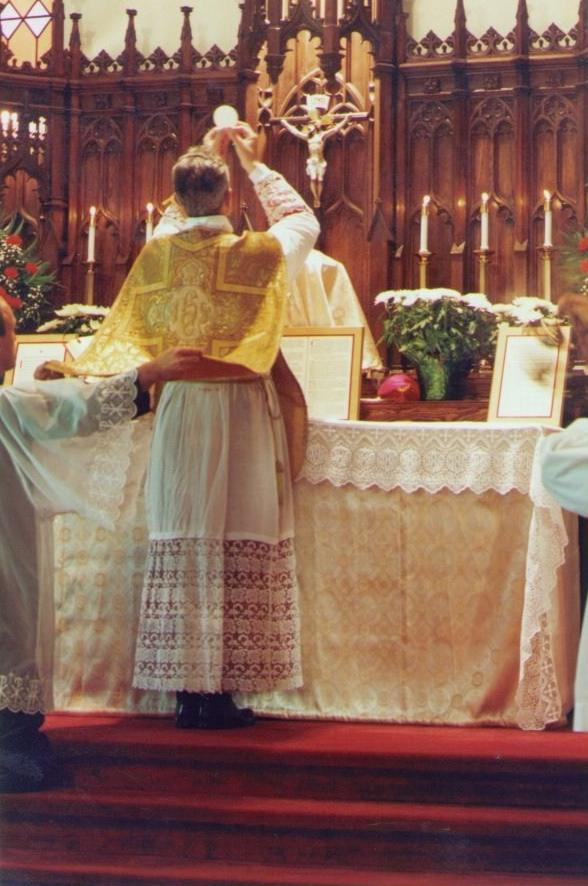
Williamson celebrating Mass in 1991

Williamson was viewed as being located towards the hardline end of the traditionalist spectrum, though he did not go quite so far as to espouse sedevacantism.

Williamson held strong views regarding gender roles. He opposed women wearing trousers or shorts, attending college or university, or having careers. He urged greater manliness in men. He denounced the film The Sound of Music as "soul-rotting slush" and said that, by putting "friendliness and fun in the place of authority and rules, it invites disorder between parents and children." He was critical of Mother Teresa, saying "we shouldn't fall for her liberal tendencies".

Williamson supported conspiracy theories regarding the assassination of John F. Kennedy, and the World Trade Center controlled demolition conspiracy theory, denying that the September 11 attacks were foreign terrorist attacks and claiming they were instead staged by the U.S. government. He also said that the 7 July 2005 London bombings were an "inside job" and propagated rumours about the likelihood of a nuclear attack on the London Olympics in 2012.

Williamson expressed antisemitic views. He called Jews the "enemies of Christ" and urged their conversion to Catholicism. He said that Jews and Freemasons contributed to the "changes and corruption" in the Catholic Church. He stated that Jews aim at world dominion and believed The Protocols of the Elders of Zion to be authentic. Williamson denied that he was promoting hatred, identifying the contemporary enemies of the faith as "Jews, Communists and Freemasons". He argued that "Anti-Semitism means many things today, for instance, when one criticizes the Israeli actions in the Gaza Strip. The Church has always understood the definition of anti-Semitism to be the rejection of Jews because of their Jewish roots. This is condemned by the Church."

From the late 1980s, Williamson was accused of Holocaust denial. Citing the pseudoscientific Leuchter report, Williamson denied that millions of Jews were murdered in Nazi concentration camps and the existence of Nazi gas chambers and praised German Holocaust denier Ernst Zündel. During an interview on Swedish television recorded in Germany in November 2008, he stated: "I believe that the historical evidence is strongly against, is hugely against six million Jews having been deliberately gassed in gas chambers as a deliberate policy of Adolf Hitler", and "I think that 200,000 to 300,000 Jews perished in Nazi concentration camps, but none of them in gas chambers."

== Lifting of excommunication ==
During the early 2000s, SSPX and the Church leadership in Rome sought to heal the rift between them. Williamson opposed compromise, accusing the Vatican of deceit and of being under "the power of Satan". He was reported as viewing reconciliation between the SSPX and the Holy See as being impossible, and that some SSPX members might refuse to follow the Society in such a direction even if an agreement were reached.

Pope Benedict XVI lifted the excommunications of the four bishops Marcel Lefebvre had consecrated, as they had requested. The decree was signed on 21 January 2009, the same day that Williamson's interview denying the Holocaust was broadcast on Swedish television. The decision stirred widespread outrage, particularly in Germany, where the interview was conducted and where Holocaust denial is illegal and punishable by imprisonment of up to five years. Reaction from much of the worldwide Jewish community was strongly negative, and Abraham Foxman, president of the Anti-Defamation League, wrote to Cardinal Walter Kasper in order to express his opposition to any ecclesiastic re-integration of Williamson. The Chief Rabbinate of Israel suspended contacts with the Vatican. The Chief Rabbi of Haifa told The Jerusalem Post that he expected Williamson to retract publicly his statements before any dialogue could resume.

Pope Benedict XVI responded by stating he deplored all forms of antisemitism and that all Catholics must do the same. The Pope expressed his "unquestionable solidarity" with the Jewish people, and stated his hope that "the memory of the Shoah will induce humanity to reflect on the unpredictable power of hate when it conquers the heart of man", and condemned the denial of the Holocaust. Vatican officials stated that they had not been aware of Williamson's views prior to the lifting of the excommunication; as a result, in a July 2009 Vatican reorganisation, the Pope tightened control and supervision over reconciliation efforts with SSPX. The Vatican declared that "in order to be admitted to episcopal functions within the Church, [Williamson] will have to take his distance, in an absolutely unequivocal and public fashion, from his position on the Shoah, which the Holy Father (i.e., the Pope) was not aware of when the excommunication was lifted."

Williamson sent the Pope a letter expressing his regret about the problems that he had caused, but did not retract his statements. On 4 February 2009 the Vatican Secretariat of State issued a note stating that Williamson would have to distance himself unequivocally and publicly from the opinions that he had expressed before he would be permitted to act as a bishop within the Church. Williamson responded that he would do so only after looking at the historical evidence for himself. On 26 February, he formally apologised for the offence that had been caused by his comments, but did not indicate that he had changed his views. The Vatican rejected his apology, stating that he needed to "unequivocally and publicly" withdraw his comments. Jewish groups expressed disappointment at the ambiguity of his apology, because he failed to address the consensus about the Holocaust.

Bishop Bernard Fellay of the SSPX initially denied any responsibility, stating that Williamson's statements were his alone and that the affair did not concern the SSPX as a whole. However, he subsequently forbade Williamson from speaking out publicly about historical or political matters, and asked Pope Benedict for forgiveness for the damage done by Williamson's statements. He stated that if Williamson again denied the Holocaust, he would be excluded from the society. In a subsequent interview he likened Williamson to uranium, asserting that, "It's dangerous when you have it", but you can't "simply leave it by the side of the road". Williamson was removed as the head of the seminary in La Reja, Argentina in February 2009, and the same month the government of Argentina asked Williamson to leave the country over irregularities with his visa, and stated that his recent statements about Jews "profoundly offend Argentinian society, the Jewish people and all of humanity". On 24 February 2009, Williamson flew from Argentina to London, where he was met by Michele Renouf, a former model known for her antisemitic views, with whom he had been put in touch by Holocaust denier David Irving. Williamson subsequently repeated the denial to followers, stating, "The fact is that the 6 million people who were supposedly gassed represent a huge lie."

== Conviction for Holocaust denial ==
On 4 February 2009, German prosecutors announced the launch of a criminal investigation into Williamson's statements. In October 2009, a German court, using an "order of punishment" fined Williamson €12,000 after finding him guilty of Holocaust denial. Williamson denied the charges and appealed, paving the way for a full hearing that Williamson did not need to attend. He did not attend the trial, on orders from his society, on charges of inciting racial hatred in Regensburg, Germany, on 16 April 2010, and was found guilty. The court reduced the fine to €10,000. Lawyers from both sides appealed the fine; the lawyer Williamson hired was the former leader of the Wiking-Jugend, an outlawed Neo-Nazi group. The Society of St. Pius X ordered Williamson to find a new lawyer under threat of expulsion. His appeal was held on 11 July 2011. The lower court's decision was upheld at appeal, but the fine was reduced to €6,500, reportedly due to Williamson's financial circumstances.

On 22 February 2012 the higher court dismissed this conviction, finding that the initial charges against Williamson had been inadequately drawn, having failed to specify the nature of his offence, or at what point his filmed comments came under German jurisdiction, or in what sense he be held liable for failing to prevent their publication in Germany. On 16 January 2013, he was prosecuted and convicted again, but this time with a much-reduced fine of €1,600 because of his "unemployed state". He refused to pay the fine and appealed again, but his appeal was dismissed. On 31 January 2019 the European Court of Human Rights ruled against Williamson’s attempt to overturn a conviction for Holocaust denial on the grounds of free speech.

== Expulsion from SSPX ==
In August 2012, Williamson administered the sacrament of confirmation to about 100 laypeople at the Benedictine Monastery of the Holy Cross in Nova Friburgo, Brazil, during an unauthorised visit to the State of Rio de Janeiro. The society's South American district superior, Christian Bouchacourt, protested against his action on the SSPX website, saying that it was "a serious act against the virtue of obedience." In early October 2012, the leadership of the SSPX gave Williamson a deadline to declare his submission, instead of which he published an "open letter" asking for the resignation of the Superior General. On 4 October 2012, the Society expelled Williamson in a "painful decision" citing the failures "to show respect and obedience deserved by his legitimate superiors".

== Final years and death ==
On his return from Argentina, Williamson settled in Broadstairs, Kent. After his expulsion from SSPX, he created the Priestly Union of Marcel Lefebvre, later known as "SSPX Resistance", gathering Catholics who opposed the SSPX's compromising with the Vatican. During this period of his life, Bishop Williamson was sighted on several occasions queueing for confession (offered in the reformed rite of Pope Paul VI) at Westminster Cathedral.

Williamson continued to espouse antisemitic views including that Jews were manipulating the stock market in order to start a world war. He suggested that Jews caused the COVID pandemic in order to reduce the population and enslave the world. In 2023, he appeared on Iranian television, where he blamed Jews for the assassination of John Kennedy, for 9/11, and for the war between Russia and Ukraine.

After his return to the UK, Williamson held regular traditional Latin Masses near his home, as well as at a library in Earlsfield, London. The bookings at the library were cancelled when his views became known in 2022.

Williamson independently consecrated six bishops. On 19 March 2015, Williamson consecrated Frenchman Jean-Michel Faure, a former member of the SSPX, as a bishop in a ceremony in Nova Friburgo, Brazil. Like Williamson, Faure opposed reconciliation discussions between the SSPX and the Catholic Church. As this was done without papal mandate, both Faure and Williamson incurred a latae sententiae excommunication. The SSPX condemned the consecration as "not at all comparable to the consecrations of 1988" and as proof that Williamson and Faure "no longer recognize the Roman authorities, except in a purely rhetorical manner".

Exactly one year later, Williamson consecrated Tomás de Aquino Ferreira da Costa as a bishop in Brazil. This consecration also took place without papal approval. Williamson consecrated a third bishop, Mexican-American prelate Gerardo Zendejas, on 11 May 2017 in Vienna, Virginia.

In late December 2022, Williamson stated he had privately consecrated another bishop, Giacomo Ballini, the leader of the Cork branch of the SSPX Resistance in 2021. On 15 August 2022, he consecrated Michał Stobnicki as a bishop in Poland. Also in 2022, Williamson consecrated Englishman Paul Morgan as a bishop on 14 February 2022 in Cork in secret, with Bishop Ballini acting as co-consecrator.

On 12 January 2024, it was reported that Williamson performed a conditional episcopal consecration for Archbishop Carlo Maria Viganò to the episcopate, during which he described Pope Francis as a "false pastor and servant of Satan".

On 24 January 2025, Williamson had a cerebral haemorrhage and was hospitalised near his home in Kent. He died in Margate on 29 January, at the age of 84. After the SSPX refused permission for his funeral to be held at one of their churches, it took place at Westgate Hall in Canterbury on 26 February 2025, led by Bishop Paul Morgan.

== Bibliography ==
- Williamson, Richard (2003). "Ruralism Versus Urbanism". In Palin, David (ed.). The Rural Solution: Modern Catholic Voices on Going Back to the Land (with Christopher McCann, Willis D. Nutting, Walter John Marx, Peter Chojnowski). Moyne, County Longford: The Traditionalist Press. pp. 21–29. ASIN B004BDOZE4. Archived from the original on 8 February 2019. ISBN 978-0-9545632-0-2 (pbk). ISBN 978-1-932528-57-2.
- Williamson, Richard. Letters from the Rector. St. Louis, MO: Marcel Editions.
  1. The Ridgefield Letters (covering 1983–1988). Vol. 1. May 2007. ISBN 978-1-940306-00-1 (pbk). ISBN 978-1-940306-05-6.
  2. The Winona Letters – Part 1 (covering 1988–1994). Vol. 2. June 2008. ISBN 978-1-940306-01-8 (pbk). ISBN 978-1-940306-09-4.
  3. The Winona Letters – Part 2 (covering 1994–1999). Vol. 3. May 2009.ISBN 978-1-940306-14-8.
  4. The Winona Letters – Part 3 (covering 2000–2003). Vol. 4. June 2009. ISBN 978-1-940306-19-3.
- White, David Allen (October 2018). The Voice of the Trumpet: A Life of Bishop Richard Williamson in Four Movements. St. Louis, MO: Marcel Editions. ASIN B07KZJCQG2. ISBN 978-1-940306-16-2 (paperback). ISBN 978-1-940306-19-3.
