= Bernard Fellay =

Swiss Traditionalist Catholic bishop (born 1958)

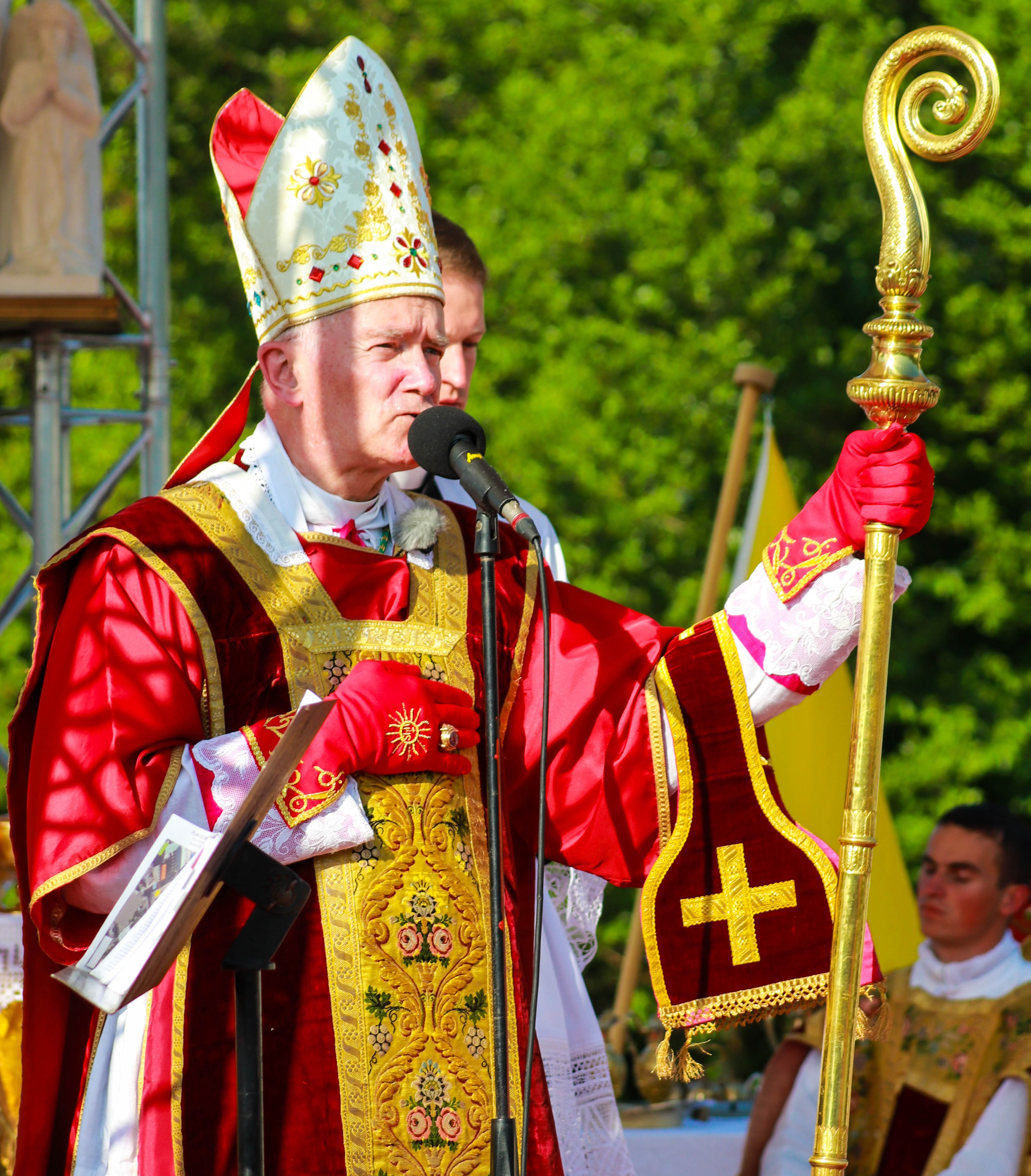
- Fellay, in 2023
- Elected: July 1994
- Term ended: 11 July 2018
- Predecessor: Franz Schmidberger
- Successor: Davide Pagliarani
- Other post: Auxiliary Bishop of the Society of Saint Pius X (1988 – present)

Orders
- Ordination: 29 June 1982 by Marcel Lefebvre
- Consecration: 30 June 1988 by Marcel Lefebvre

Personal details
- Born: 12 April 1958 (age 68) Sierre, Switzerland
- Education: The International Seminary of Saint Pius X
- Motto: Spes nostra (Latin for 'Our hope')
- Coat of arms

Ordination history
History
Priestly ordination
- Ordained by: Marcel Lefebvre
- Date: 29 June 1982
- Place: The International Seminary of Saint Pius X, Écône, Switzerland
Episcopal consecration
- Principal consecrator: Marcel Lefebvre
- Co-consecrators: Antônio de Castro Mayer
- Date: 30 June 1988
- Place: The International Seminary of Saint Pius X, Écône, Switzerland

Bernard Fellay (born 12 April 1958) is an excommunicated Swiss Catholic bishop who served as superior general of the Society of Saint Pius X (SSPX) from 1994 to 2018.

In 1988, Pope John Paul II announced that Fellay and three others were automatically excommunicated for being consecrated as bishops by SSPX Archbishop Marcel Lefebvre, an act that the Holy See described as "unlawful" and "schismatic". Lefebvre and Bishop Antônio de Castro Mayer, who co-consecrated the four bishops, were also automatically excommunicated.

In January 2009, the Congregation for Bishops, on instructions from Pope Benedict XVI, lifted the excommunications.

In July 2026, Fellay was automatically excommunicated from the Catholic Church for the consecration of four bishops without a papal mandate.

== Early life and ministry ==
Fellay was born in Sierre, Switzerland in 1958. In October 1977, at the age of nineteen, Fellay began studies for the priesthood at the International Seminary of Saint Pius X at Écône, Switzerland. On 29 June 1982 he was ordained a priest by Archbishop Marcel Lefebvre. After his ordination, he was named Bursar General of the SSPX and was stationed at Rickenbach, the headquarters of the SSPX in Switzerland at the time. He continued in that position for the next ten years.

== Consecration and excommunications (1988) ==
In June 1988, Archbishop Marcel Lefebvre announced his intention to consecrate Fellay and three other priests (Bernard Tissier de Mallerais, Richard Williamson, and Alfonso de Galarreta) as bishops. Lefebvre did not have a pontifical mandate for these consecrations (i.e. permission from the Pope), normally required by Canon 1382 of the Code of Canon Law, despite repeatedly requesting permission and being promised it, but with no timeline being given. On 17 June 1988 Cardinal Bernardin Gantin, prefect of the Congregation for Bishops sent the four priests a formal canonical warning that they would automatically incur the penalty of excommunication if they were to be consecrated by Lefebvre without papal permission.

On 30 June 1988, Fellay and the three other priests were consecrated bishop by Archbishop Lefebvre and Bishop Antônio de Castro Mayer. On 1 July 1988, Cardinal Gantin issued a declaration stating that Lefebvre, de Castro Mayer, Fellay, and the three other newly ordained bishops "have incurred ipso facto the excommunication latae sententiae reserved to the Apostolic See".

On 2 July 1988, Pope John Paul II issued the motu proprio Ecclesia Dei, in which he reaffirmed the excommunication, and described the consecration as an act of "disobedience to the Roman pontiff in a very grave matter and of supreme importance for the unity of the Church", and that "such disobedience – which implies in practice the rejection of the Roman primacy – constitutes a schismatic act". Cardinal Darío Castrillón Hoyos, head of the commission responsible for implementing Ecclesia Dei, has said this resulted in a "situation of separation, even if it was not a formal schism."

The SSPX denied the validity of the excommunications, saying that the consecrations were necessary, according to canon law, which allowed bishops to be consecrated without a papal mandate in situations perceived to be grave, with the SSPX citing the moral and theological crisis in the Catholic Church.

== SSPX superior general, lifting of excommunciation ==
In July 1994 the General Chapter of the SSPX met at Écône and elected Fellay as superior general in succession to Father Franz Schmidberger. On 12 July 2006, he was re-elected for another term of 12 years.

On 29 August 2005, Fellay was received in audience by Pope Benedict XVI at Castel Gandolfo. The audience was also attended by Cardinal Castrillón Hoyos and Father Schmidberger. They discussed the present state of the Church and of the SSPX, the Society's concerns about Modernism in the Church, the restoration of the Tridentine Mass, and the possible recognition of the SSPX by the Holy See.

By a decree of 21 January 2009, which was issued in response to a renewed request that Bishop Fellay made on behalf of all four bishops whom Lefebvre had consecrated on 30 June 1988, the Prefect of the Congregation for Bishops, by the power granted to him by Pope Benedict XVI, remitted the automatic excommunication that they had incurred, and expressed the wish that this would be followed speedily by full communion of the whole of the Society of Saint Pius X with the Church, thus bearing witness, by the proof of visible unity, to true loyalty and true recognition of the Pope's Magisterium and authority. The canonical situation of the four bishops thus became the same as that of the other clergy of the Society, who are suspended a divinis.

Speaking in relation to the talks with Rome in an interview in July 2009, Fellay said of the significance of the Second Vatican Council, "We will not make any compromise on the Council. I have no intention of making a compromise. The truth does not tolerate compromise. We do not want a compromise, we want clarity regarding the Council." In February 2011, Fellay said that the reconciliation talks with the Vatican would soon be coming to an end, with little change in the views of either side. In addition to disputes over the changes introduced by the Second Vatican Council, new problems have been created by plans for the beatification of Pope John Paul II. Fellay said the scheduled beatification of Pope John Paul II on 1 May 2011 posed "a serious problem, the problem of a pontificate that caused things to proceed by leaps and bounds in the wrong direction, along 'progressive' lines, toward everything that they call 'the spirit of Vatican II.'" Bishop Williamson, in his weekly message, wrote that Fellay was being too open to dialogue between the Society of St. Pius X and the Holy See. However, on 12 October 2013, Fellay declared, "We thank God, we have been preserved from any kind of agreement from last year", saying that the society had withdrawn the compromise text that it presented to Rome on 15 April 2012.

On the same occasion, he spoke of the Third Secret of Fatima as seemingly foretelling "both a material chastisement and a great crisis in the Church" and described Pope Francis as "a genuine Modernist", who, in late July 2013, had begun a series of contacts, regarding which Fellay said: "We may not have the entire picture at this point, we have enough to be scared to death."

On 28 December 2012, in a radio interview aired from Our Lady of Mount Carmel Chapel in New Hamburg, Ontario, Canada, Bishop Fellay declared, "Who, during that time, was the most opposed that the Church would recognize the Society? The enemies of the Church. The Jews, the Masons, the Modernists." That was taken by various media entities to be an attack on the Jewish faith.

The Society of St. Pius X issued the following reply: "The word 'enemies' used here by Bishop Fellay is of course a religious concept and refers to any group or religious sect which opposes the mission of the Catholic Church and her efforts to fulfill it: the salvation of souls. ...By referring to the Jews, Bishop Fellay's comment was aimed at the leaders of Jewish organizations, and not the Jewish people, as is being implied by journalists. Accordingly the Society of St. Pius X denounces the repeated false accusations of anti-Semitism or hate speech made in an attempt to silence its message."

On 9 December 2014, Bishop Fellay came at the European Parliament of Brussels and blessed the nativity scene made by the artisan masters of San Gregorio Armeno, Naples, on an initiative of the Italian politician Mario Borghezio (Lega Nord) and at the presence of the Veneto's governor Luca Zaia. The same benediction was replicated four years later.

It was reported on 24 May 2017, that SSPX bishops have been authorized by the Vatican to ordain priests without permission of the local bishop.

In July 2017, Bishop Fellay signed a document along with a number of other clergy and academics labeled as a "Filial Correction" of Pope Francis. The twenty-five page document, which was made public in September after receiving no reply from the Holy See, stated that the Pope could possibly be saying various words, actions and omissions during his pontificate going against charity and the Church.

Fellay's term as Superior General concluded on 11 July 2018 upon the election of Davide Pagliarani as his successor.

== 2026 consecrations, new excommunication ==
Following the schismatic July 2026 Écône consecrations, Fellay was excommunicated automatically by the Catholic Church as proscribed by Canon 1387 of the 1983 Code of Canon Law.
