= Écône =

Human settlement in Switzerland

Coordinates: 46°9′22″N 7°12′27″E

Location of Écône

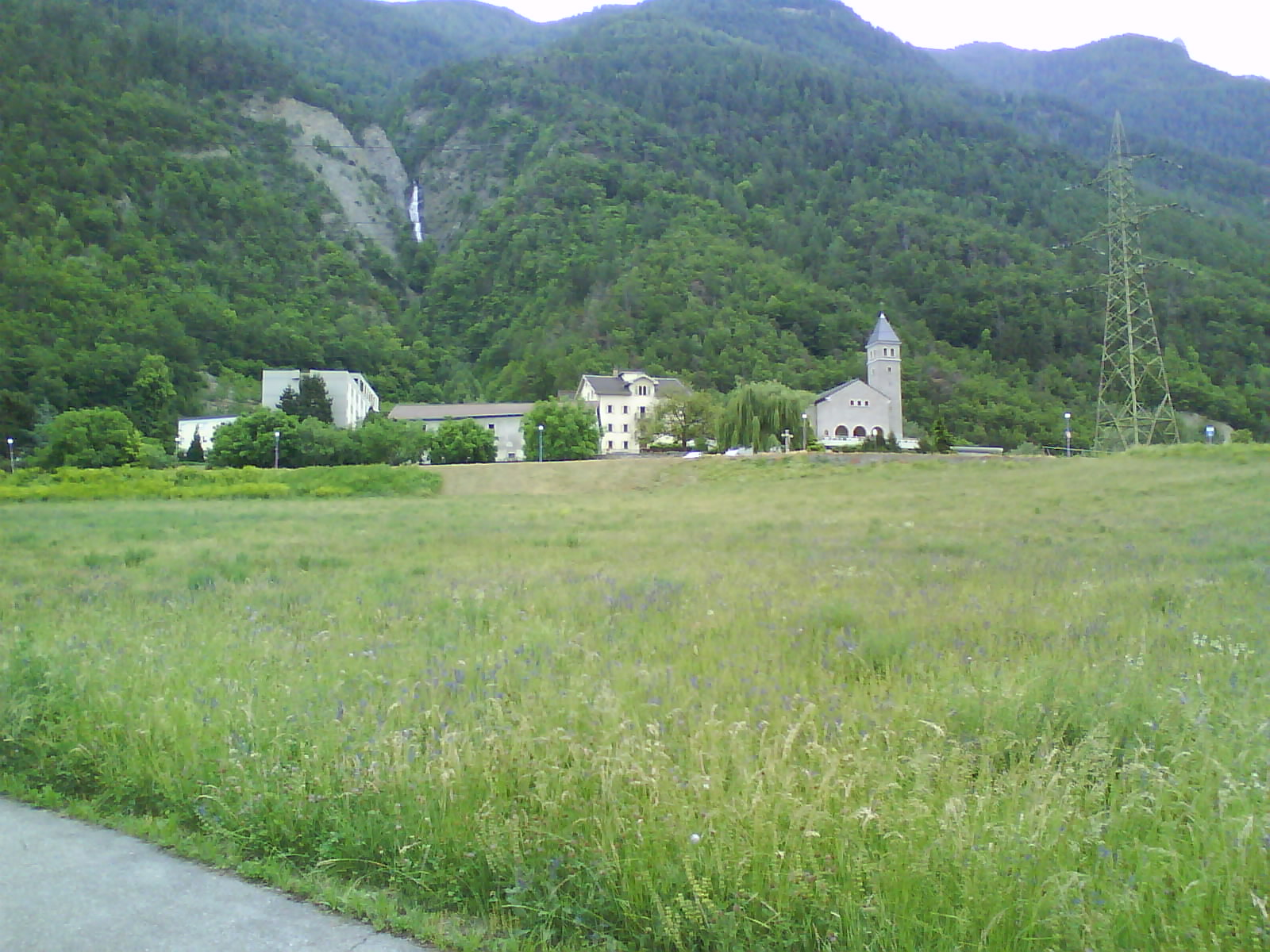
Society of Saint Pius X Seminary in Écône

Écône (from Latin: Esquinium) is an area in the municipality of Riddes, district of Martigny, in the canton of Valais, Switzerland. It is the location of the International Seminary of Saint Pius X.

The 1988 Écône consecrations and the 2026 Écône consecrations were held in Écône.
