= Licínio Rangel =

Brazilian Catholic bishop (1936–2002)

His Excellency The Right Reverend Licínio Rangel
- Titular Bishop of Zarna; Personal Apostolic Administrator of Saint John Mary Vianney
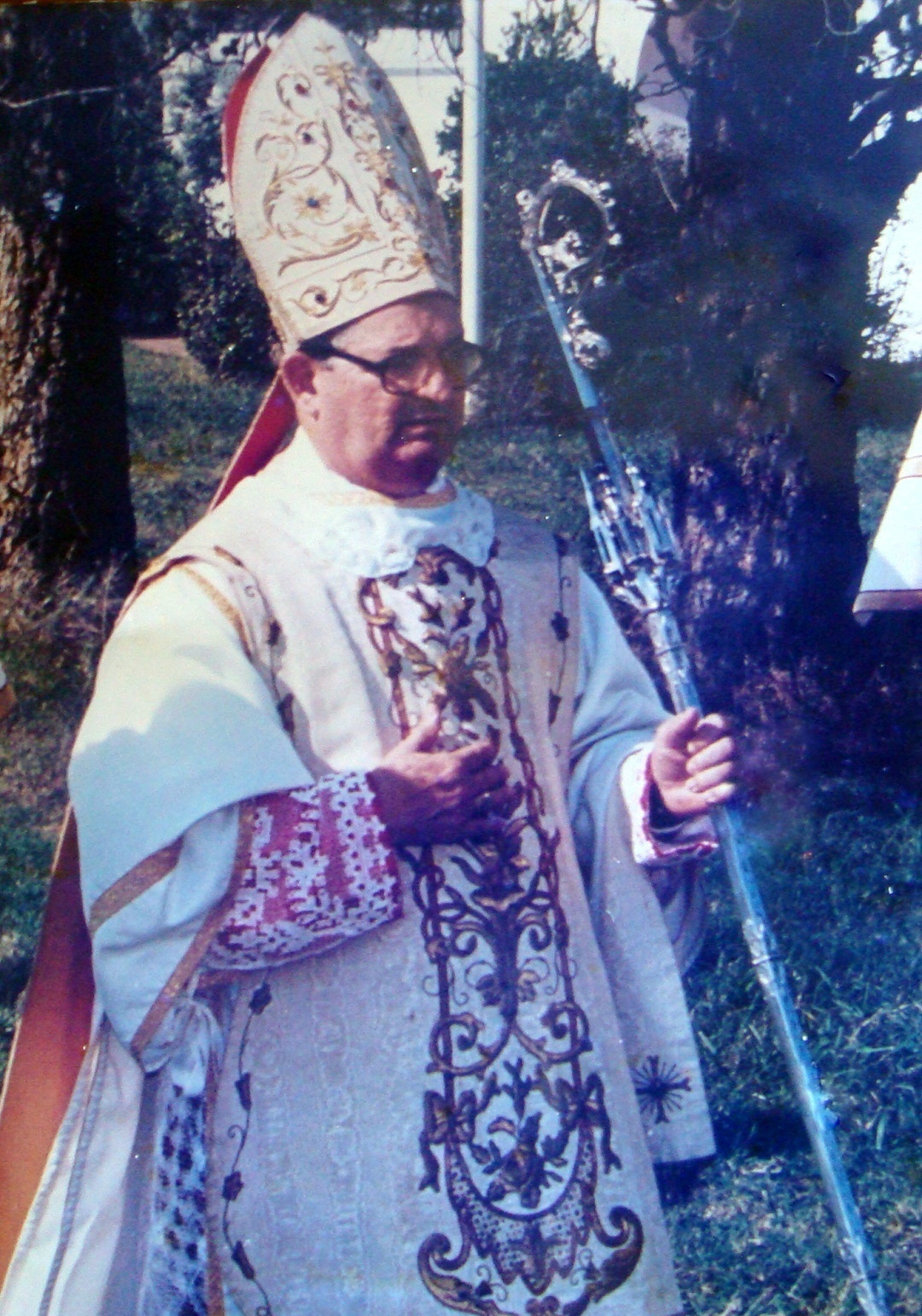
- Rangel, circa 1990s
- Church: Catholic
- See: Personal Apostolic Administration of Saint John Mary Vianney
- In office: 18 January 2002 – 16 December 2002
- Successor: Fernando Arêas Rifan

Orders
- Ordination: 24 September 1967 by Antônio de Castro Mayer
- Consecration: 28 July 1991 by Bernard Tissier de Mallerais

Personal details
- Born: January 5, 1936 Campos, Brazil
- Died: December 16, 2002 (aged 66)

Ordination history of Licínio Rangel
History
Priestly ordination
- Ordained by: Antônio de Castro Mayer
- Date: 24 September 1967
- Place: Most Holy Saviour Cathedral, Campos dos Goytacazes
Episcopal consecration
- Principal consecrator: Bernard Tissier de Mallerais
- Co-consecrators: Alfonso de Galarreta, Richard Williamson
- Date: July 28, 1991
- Place: São Fidélis

Licínio Rangel (5 January 1936 – 16 December 2002) was a Brazilian who was consecrated a bishop without papal authorization in 1991 and later reconciled with the Holy See.

== Biography ==
Rangel was born in Campos, Brazil, on 5 January 1936.

He was consecrated in 1991 in São Fidélis, a suburb of Rio de Janeiro, even as the Vatican was threatening those involved with excommunication.

He was consecrated a bishop without a papal mandate on 28 July 1991 at São Fidélis in Rio de Janeiro by Bernard Tissier de Mallerais, assisted by Alfonso de Galarreta and Richard Williamson, all three members of the Society of St. Pius X who were themselves consecrated bishops without papal mandate and thus excommunicated from the Catholic Church. For his participation in this unauthorized rite of consecration he was excommunicated latae sententiae.

He succeeded Bishop Antônio de Castro Mayer in 1991 as superior of the Priestly Society of Saint John Mary Vianney, an association of priests in the diocese of Campos, Brazil.

On 15 August 2001, Rangel together with all 25 of the member priests reconciled with the Holy See. He addressed a letter to Pope John Paul II in which he confirmed his full submission to and communion with Rome. Pope John Paul responded on 25 December welcoming them into full communion with the Church and withdrawing any censures imposed on them. He also created the Personal Apostolic Administration of Saint John Mary Vianney on that day, with its territory matching that of the Diocese of Campos, and granted its members the right to celebrate Mass in the form instituted by Pope Pius V as amended by Pope John XXIII.

On 18 January 2002, Pope John Paul appointed Rangel its apostolic administrator and titular bishop of Zarna.

Rangel died in Campos of kidney cancer on 16 December 2002.
