= Bernard Tissier de Mallerais =

French traditionalist Catholic bishop (1945–2024)

- Tissier de Mallerais in 2010
- Church: Catholic Church
- Other post: Auxiliary Bishop of the Society of Saint Pius X (1988 – 2024)
- Previous post: Secretary General, Society of Saint Pius X (1984 – 1996); Chaplain, Novitiate of the Sisters of the Society of Saint Pius X (1983 – 1984); Rector, International Seminary of Saint Pius X (1979 – 1983)

Orders
- Ordination: 29 June 1975 by Marcel Lefebvre
- Consecration: 30 June 1988 by Marcel Lefebvre

Personal details
- Born: 14 September 1945 Sallanches, France
- Died: 8 October 2024 (aged 79) Martigny, Switzerland
- Buried: International Seminary of Saint Pius X, Écône, Valais, Switzerland
- Denomination: Roman Catholic
- Education: The International Seminary of Saint Pius X
- Motto: Pax Christi Regis (Latin for 'Peace of Christ the King')
- Signature: Bernard Tissier de Mallerais's signature

Ordination history
History
Priestly ordination
- Ordained by: Marcel Lefebvre
- Date: 29 June 1975
- Place: The International Seminary of Saint Pius X, Écône
Episcopal consecration
- Principal consecrator: Marcel Lefebvre
- Co-consecrators: Antônio de Castro Mayer
- Date: 30 June 1988
- Place: The International Seminary of Saint Pius X
Episcopal succession
Bishops consecrated by Bernard Tissier de Mallerais as principal consecrator
- Licínio Rangel: 28 July 1991
- Styles
- Reference style: His Excellency, The Most Reverend
- Spoken style: Your Excellency
- Religious style: Bishop

Bernard Tissier de Mallerais FSSPX (French pronunciation: [bɛʁnaʁ tisje də maləʁɛ]; 14 September 1945 – 8 October 2024) was a French traditionalist Catholic cleric who served as a bishop of the Society of Saint Pius X from 1988 until his death in 2024. He was one of four men consecrated by Archbishop Marcel Lefebvre, incurring automatic excommunication and suspension. The excommunication was later lifted by Pope Benedict XVI in 2009. The SSPX denied the validity of the excommunications, citing canon law.

== Early life and ministry ==
Tissier de Mallerais was born in Sallanches, Haute-Savoie, France, on 14 September 1945. After obtaining a master's degree in biology, he entered the International Seminary of Saint Pius X at Fribourg in October 1969. On 29 June 1975, he was ordained priest by Archbishop Marcel Lefebvre at Écône. He served first as a professor, then as vice-rector, and finally as rector of the seminary at Écône. In 1979, he was appointed Rector of the Seminary where he remained until 1983. For a year, he served as Chaplain at the Novitiate of the Sisters of the Society of St Pius X (SSPX), until in 1984, he was elected to the post of Secretary General of the Society which he held until 1996.

== Consecration and aftermath ==
In June 1988, Archbishop Marcel Lefebvre, who sensed that he was approaching his death, consecrated de Mallerais and three other priests (Bernard Fellay, Richard Williamson, and Alfonso de Galarreta) as bishops. Lefebvre did not have a pontifical mandate for these consecrations, which was promised in exhausting negotiations, but always postponed or subjected to destabilizing conditions. On 1 July 1988 Cardinal Gantin issued a declaration stating that Lefebvre, bishop Antônio de Castro Mayer, de Mallerais, and the three other newly ordained bishops "have incurred ipso facto the excommunication latae sententiae reserved to the Apostolic See."

The validity of the excommunications is disputed by the SSPX. It argues that the consecrations were necessary due to a moral and theological crisis in the Catholic Church. Bishop de Mallerais argues for the validity and necessity of these consecrations in his article "Supplied Jurisdiction & Traditional Priests," stating: "in an exceptional situation the Church supplies for this absence of jurisdiction on the part of the priest or even the bishop," and "it is the case of necessity amongst the faithful which is responsible for the fact that traditional priests and bishops have a supplied jurisdiction with respect to your needs."

By a decree of 21 January 2009 (Protocol Number 126/2009), issued in response to a request which Bishop Fellay made on behalf of all four bishops whom Lefebvre had consecrated on 30 June 1988, the Prefect of the Congregation for Bishops, Cardinal Giovanni Battista Re, by the power expressly granted to him by Pope Benedict XVI, remitted the automatic excommunication which they had thereby incurred, and expressed the wish that this would be followed speedily by full communion of the whole of the Society of Saint Pius X with the Church, thus bearing witness, by the proof of visible unity, to true loyalty and true recognition of the Pope's Magisterium and authority.

== SSPX bishop ==
In 1991, Tissier de Mallerais consecrated Licínio Rangel as bishop for the Priestly Society of St John Mary Vianney after the death of its founder, bishop Antônio de Castro Mayer. The duties of Tissier de Mallerais in the SSPX included the administration of the sacraments, particularly the sacrament of confirmation. He travelled extensively throughout the world, visiting SSPX chapels and communities.

== Death ==
On 28 September 2024, Tissier de Mallerais suffered a skull fracture and internal haemorrhage due to a trip and fall on stairs in the seminary in Écône. He was temporarily placed into an induced coma. Tissier de Mallerais died on 8 October 2024, at the age of 79.

His funeral was officiated on 18 October 2024 by Bishop Alfonso de Galarreta, after which he was buried in the crypt of the International Seminary of Saint Pius X at Écône, where Archbishop Marcel Lefebvre and Bishop Vitus Huonder also rest. Following his death, speculation concerning the consecration of a new bishop for the SSPX to fill de Mallerais' place intensified.

== Bibliography ==
=== Author ===
- Marcel Lefebvre, une vie (Clovis, 2002) ISBN 9782912642820
  - Marcel Lefebvre: The Biography. Clovis. 2002. ISBN 1892331241.
  - Marcel Lefebvre: Eine Biographie (Sarto, 2009) ISBN 9783932691577
  - Marcel Lefebvre: la biografía (Editorial Actas, 2012) ISBN 9788497391238
- Faith Imperiled by Reason: Benedict XVI's Hermeneutics
- C'est moi, l'accusé, qui devrais vous juger! (Clovis, 2019) ISBN 9782350051536
- The Rest of the Story: A Summary of the Life and Times of Archbishop Marcel Lefebvre. Angelus Press. 2021. ISBN 978-1949124774.
- Marcel Lefebvre: Raconté par ses proches (Clovis, 2022) ISBN 9782384250066
