= Fernando Arêas Rifan =

Brazilian Catholic bishop (born 1950)

His Excellency The Most Reverend Fernando Arêas Rifan
- Titular Bishop of Cedamusa; Personal Apostolic Administrator of Saint John Mary Vianney
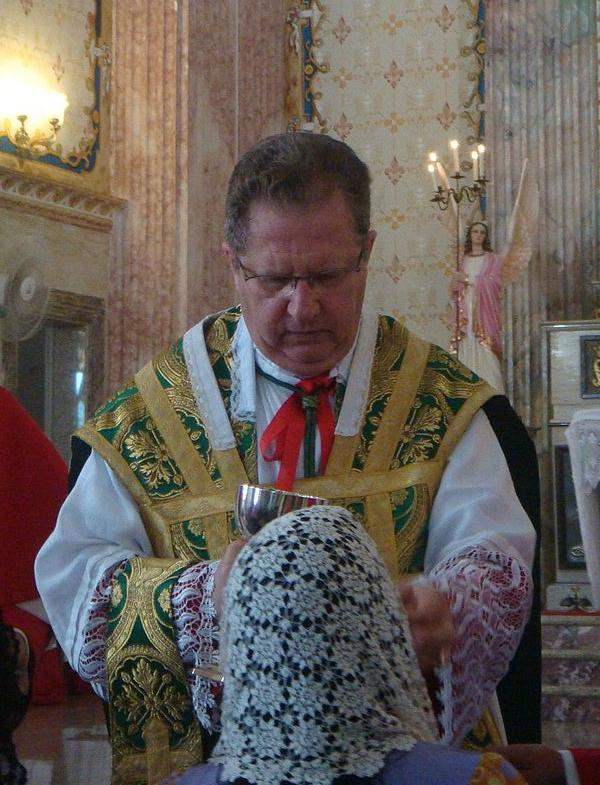
- Rifan in 2012
- Church: Latin Church
- See: Personal Apostolic Administration of Saint John Mary Vianney
- In office: 16 December 2002 – present
- Predecessor: Licínio Rangel
- Previous post: Coadjutor Apostolic Administrator of Saint John Mary Vianney (2002)

Orders
- Ordination: 8 December 1974 by Antonio de Castro Mayer
- Consecration: 18 August 2002 by Darío Castrillón Hoyos, Licínio Rangel, and Alano Maria Pena

Personal details
- Born: 25 October 1950 (age 76) São Fidélis, Rio de Janeiro, Brazil
- Motto: Ecce venio (Here I come)
- Coat of arms: Fernando Arêas Rifan's coat of arms

Ordination history of Fernando Arêas Rifan
History
Priestly ordination
- Ordained by: Antonio de Castro Mayer
- Date: 8 December 1974
- Place: Diocese of Campos
Episcopal consecration
- Principal consecrator: Darío Castrillón Hoyos
- Co-consecrators: Licínio Rangel, Alano Maria Pena
- Date: 18 August 2002

Fernando Arêas Rifan (born 25 October 1950) is a bishop of the Catholic Church from Campos, Brazil. Since December 2002 he has been the Apostolic Administrator of the Personal Apostolic Administration of Saint John Mary Vianney, also known as the Priestly Union of Saint Jean-Marie Vianney. For some years before 2001 he was allied with Priestly Union when it defied the Holy See by routinely using unauthorized liturgical forms and associated with the Society of St. Pius X. He helped negotiate the reconciliation of the Priestly Union with the Holy See in 2001.

== Life ==
Fernando Arêas Rifan was born in São Fidélis in the diocese of Campos, Brazil. He studied at the minor seminary of Mary Immaculate and then from 1968 to 1974 at the major seminary in Campos. He was ordained a priest of that diocese on 8 December 1974.

He was secretary to the bishop in 1975–1976, diocesan consultant from 1975 to 1982, pastor of the parish of "Nossa Senhora do Rosário" in Campos from 1976 to 1986, director and professor of the "Três Pastorinhos" college in Campos from 1983 to 2002.

He joined the Priestly Union of Saint Jean-Marie Vianney, founded by Bishop Antônio de Castro Mayer, Bishop of Campos, who had refused to accept in his diocese the revision of the liturgy of the Roman Rite by Pope Paul VI. On 30 June 1988, Rifan acted as assistant presbyter at the episcopal consecration without papal authorization of four Catholic priests by Archbishop Marcel Lefebvre and Bishop Castro Mayer.

The Priestly Union reconciled with the Holy See in 2001–2002 and Pope John Paul II established the Personal Apostolic Administration of Saint John Mary Vianney on 18 January 2002. Rifan represented the Priestly Union in the negotiations with the Holy See that resulted in that reconciliation. The newly reconciled Bishop Licínio Rangel was named apostolic administrator and Rifan was appointed its vicar general.

To ensure the status of the apostolic administration as he had promised, Pope John Paul named Rifan coadjutor bishop of the apostolic administration and titular bishop of Cedamusa on 28 June 2002. He received his episcopal consecration on 18 August 2002 from Cardinal Darío Castrillón Hoyos, President of the Pontifical Commission Ecclesia Dei, assisted by Rangel and Archbishop Alano Maria Pena of Niterói.

=== Apostolic administrator ===
On Rangel's death on 16 December 2002, Rifan became head of the Apostolic Administration.

In his first pastoral letter, Rifan stressed the importance of the papal mandate given him. He also warned against heresy and praised the traditional Latin liturgy and liturgical discipline as a defense against it. He counseled members of the Apostolic Administration against schism, demonstrated by "a general taste for systematic criticism of Church authorities, a spirit of resistance, disobedience, disrespect, suspicion, backbiting, independence from the Church's Hierarchy and Magisterium, contentment with the abnormality of the situation, uncharitableness, a feeling of owning the whole of truth, a sectarian attitude that made us out to be the only good people".

In a pastoral letter on the election of Pope Benedict XVI, Rifan declared his loyalty and quoted Pope Pius XII: "They, therefore, walk in the path of dangerous error who believe that they can accept Christ as the Head of the Church, while not adhering loyally to His Vicar on earth." He also stated that a "situation of separation of traditional Catholics from the hierarchy, provoked by the crises in the Church, besides being abnormal, must be temporary and momentary; it should inspire in us an anxiety for regularization and union rather than a complacency with our situation."

In a May 2003 interview with La Nef, Bishop Rifan spoke of the Apostolic Administration's relations with the Society of St Pius X (SSPX) as follows: We have tried to be as friendly as possible with the SSPX and its superiors, but after we had informed them that we had serious reasons for continuing our contacts with Rome, which they did not intend to keep up, they began to criticize us severely, attempting also to dishonour us by putting in doubt our intentions and trying to create divisions among our faithful. After our recognition by the Holy See, the SSPX leadership removed our name from the lists of traditional Masses and began to foster Masses in the areas where we celebrate. Does that mean that the traditional Mass is good only when it is cut off from the Hierarchy? But thank God our faithful distinguish between love for the traditional Mass from the evil attitude that makes the traditional Mass a banner to wave against the Hierarchy.

The SSPX and other traditionalist groups reproached Bishop Rifan for concelebrating Mass according to the revised rite on 28 May 2011 and other occasions. They underscored his participation in concelebrations, an innovation of the Second Vatican Council.

In 2013, Rifan reviewed and approved the publication of a guided version of John Paul II's catechism. After turning 75, Rifan met with Pope Leo XIV on 15 November, 2025, and submitted his resignation letter. Leo granted Rifan an eighteen-month extension to allow Rifan to prepare his future successor for the apostolic administration.

Preceded by Licínio Rangel	Personal Apostolic Administrator of Saint John Vianney; 16 December 2002 – present	Succeeded by incumbent
