= Roberto Gomes Guimarães =

Brazilian Roman Catholic bishop (1936–2025)

His Excellency Roberto Gomes Guimarães
- Bishop Emeritus of Campos
- Archdiocese: Niterói
- Diocese: Campos
- Appointed: November 22, 1995
- Term ended: June 8, 2011
- Predecessor: João Corso
- Successor: Roberto Francisco Ferrería Paz

Orders
- Ordination: December 8, 1961
- Consecration: January 7, 1996 by Carlos Alberto Etchandy Gimeno Navarro

Personal details
- Born: January 3, 1936 Campos dos Goytacazes, Rio de Janeiro, Brazil
- Died: May 29, 2025 (aged 89) Campos dos Goytacazes, Rio de Janeiro, Brazil

Roberto Gomes Guimarães (January 3, 1936 – May 29, 2025) was a Brazilian Catholic bishop who served as bishop emeritus of Campos, Rio de Janeiro, until his death on May 29, 2025, at the age of 89.

On June 8, 2011, Pope Benedict XVI accepted his request to resign, due to age limit, from the office of bishop of the Diocese of Campos.

Catholic Church titles
Preceded by João Corso	Bishop of Campos; 1995–2011	Succeeded by Roberto Francisco Ferrería Paz
