= District of Ireland (SSPX) =

Region of Society of Saint Pius X

The Society of Saint Pius X (Latin: Fraternitas Sacerdotalis Sancti Pii X; also known as the SSPX or the FSSPX) is an international priestly fraternity founded in 1970 by the French Roman Catholic Archbishop Marcel Lefebvre.

== History ==
Archbishop Lefebvre first visited Ireland in 1961 for the Patrician Congress in his capacity as head of the West African hierarchy, this was for when he was Archbishop of Dakar and Apostolic delegate for French Speaking Africa. He visited again in 1964 for a celebration in Rockwell College. Both of these were before the Second Vatican Council. His next visit to Ireland was at the invitation of the College Theological Society at Trinity College Dublin in 1978. This was after his decision to ordain some seminarians in the summer of 1976. On that occasion the Archbishop told the people who came to hear him that the Irish were, in his opinion, traditionalists at heart and if they knew what he really believed they would be more receptive. He also claimed that he did not oppose Pope Paul VI. He was accompanied on that occasion by Rev. Richard Williamson one of his English speaking priests. By the late 1970s and early 1980s there was a group of Catholics in Ireland that desired to attend Tridentine Mass. There was no resident priest and people hosted priests that came from England to offer Mass on a monthly basis. In 1980 Lefebvre visited again and spoke on 8 May in Liberty Hall and held a press conference on the same day. On the following day he offered Mass in the Central Hotel for about 150 people.

In 1982 a priest was assigned to Ireland on a full-time basis and it was necessary to purchase a suitable residence. This was done despite the small size of a congregation at the time. With a full-time priest resident in Ireland and regular services the size of the congregation more than doubled to over 500 and it was necessary to purchase a church. It wasn't until the summer of 1985 that the faithful of the Society of St Pius X had a permanent church of their own in Ireland. The first Mass in the newly acquired church was offered by Fr. John Emerson on 11 August that year with over 250 faithful in attendance. The church was dedicated by Archbishop Lefebvre in front of a congregation of 500 on 29 September. In the same year two men from Ireland entered the seminary in Écône. At this time the priest resident in Dublin also traveled to offer Masses in Newry and Belfast.
