= Group for Reflection among Catholics =

Dialogue among traditionalist Catholics in France

The Group for Reflection among Catholics (French: Groupe de réflexion entre catholiques, GREC) is an informal organization for "meetings and discussions among Catholics" with the purpose of supporting contact and communication between the Society of St. Pius X and the Catholic Church in France.

== History ==
GREC was started in 1997 at the initiative of Huguette Pérol, widow of the ambassador of France to Italy Gilbert Pérol.

For twelve years, the group met monthly, inviting various speakers and organizing a much-noted 2003 colloquium on the theme "Tradition and Modernity".

After having organized discreet meetings between the SSPX and the Holy See at the nunciature in Paris, it decided to place itself in abeyance in 2009, when doctrinal discussions began.

== Members ==
- Alain Lorans, priest member of the SSPX and director of its press service DICI.
- Claude Barthe (b. 1947), priest of the diocese of Auch.
- Michel Lelong (b. 1925) of the White Fathers, formerly very active in dialogue with Muslims.
- Olivier de la Brosse (b. 1931), a priest long assigned at Rome.

== See also ==
=== Bibliography ===
- Michel Lelong (2012). Pour la nécessaire réconciliation: Le Groupe de Réflexion Entre Catholiques (GREC) (in French). Paris: Nouvelles Éditions latines. p. 160. ISBN 9782723395809.

=== Related articles ===
- Traditionalist Catholicism
- Society of St. Pius X
