= Franz Schmidberger =

German Catholic priest

The Reverend Fr Franz Schmidberger FSSPX
- Superior General of the Society of Saint Pius X
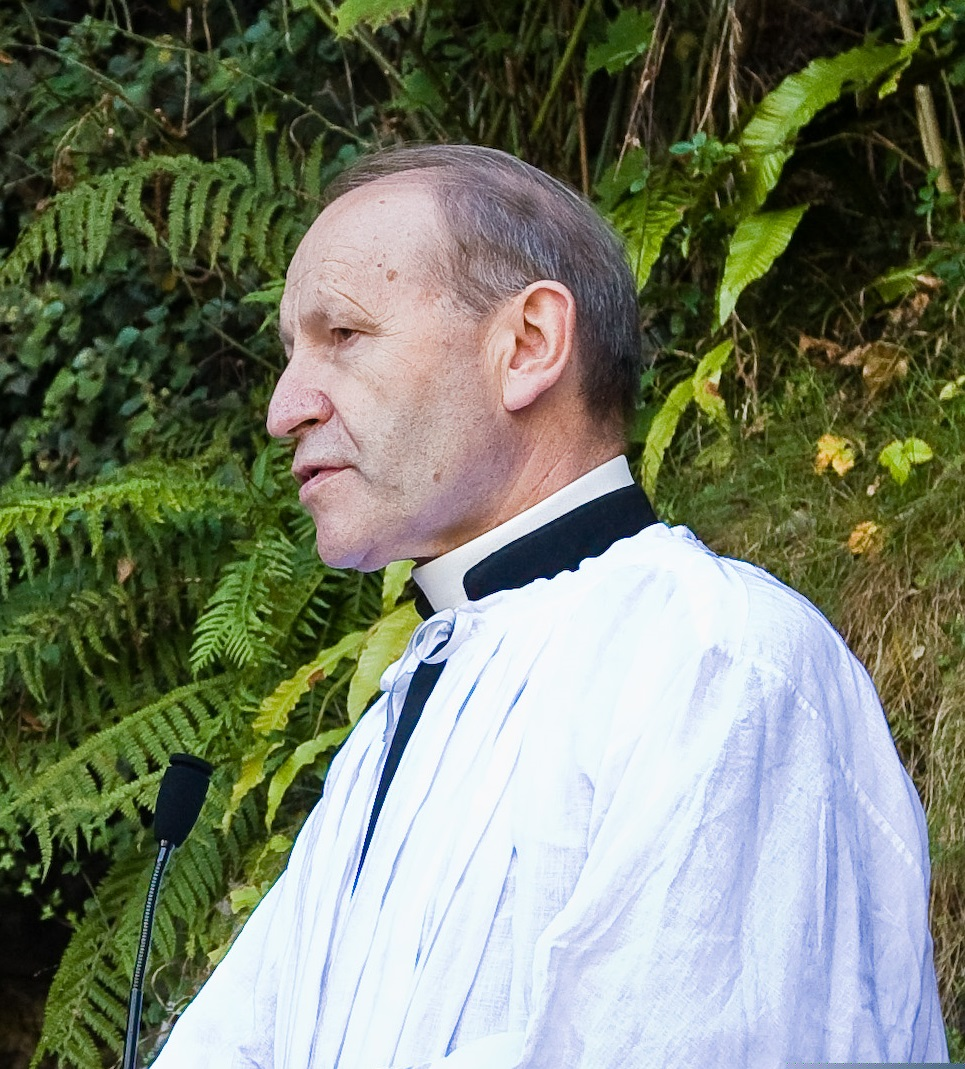
- Franz Schmidberger, Lourdes (France), 2008
- In office: 1982–1994
- Predecessor: Marcel Lefebvre
- Successor: Bernard Fellay

Orders
- Ordination: 8 December 1975 by Marcel Lefebvre

Personal details
- Born: 19 October 1946 (age 80)
- Denomination: Traditionalist Catholic
- Education: LMU Munich; International Seminary of Saint Pius X

Franz Schmidberger FSSPX (born 19 October 1946) is a German priest of the Society of St. Pius X, founded by Archbishop Marcel Lefebvre.

== Biography ==
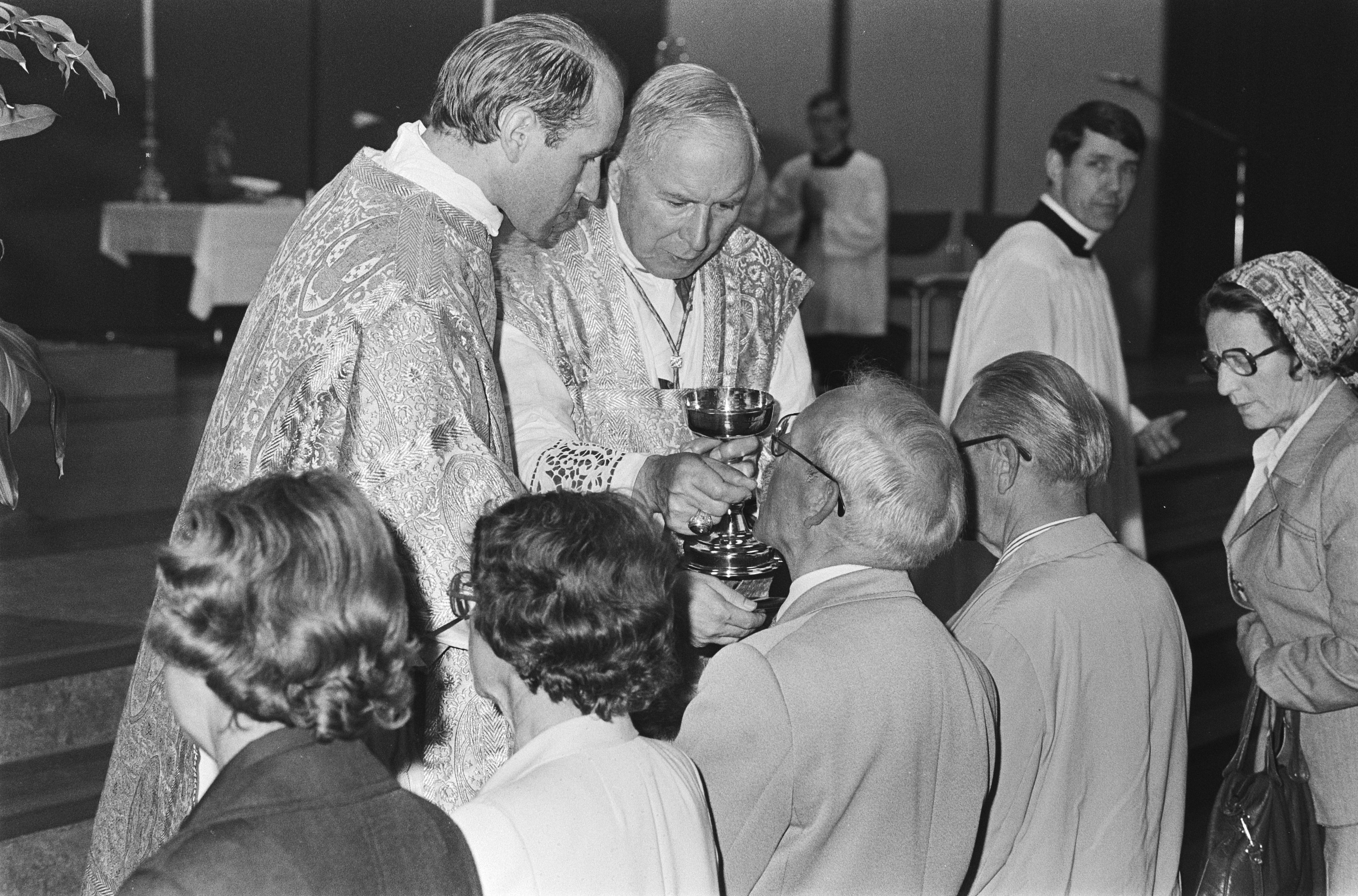
Archbishop Lefebvre giving Communion assisted by Schmidberger

Schmidberger studied mathematics at LMU Munich, and graduated in 1972. There, he came under the influence of de:Reinhard Lauth, a philosophy professor who opposed the reforms of the Second Vatican Council. Following his graduation, he entered the seminary of Écône. He was ordained a priest on 8 December 1975 by Marcel Lefebvre. Later, he taught in the seminary of Weissbad, the first German-speaking seminary of the Society.

In 1978, he founded the seminary of Zaitzkofen in Germany, where he was appointed district superior from 1979.

In 1982, Schmidberger was appointed superior general of the society of St Pius X (quitting the post of district superior). In 1994, he was succeeded by Bishop Bernard Fellay. He subsequently served as 1st General Assistant (1994-2006), Austrian (1996-2000) and again German (2006-2013) district superior as well as regent of the Zaitzkofen seminary (2003-2005 and 2013-2020).

With Fellay, he is said to be part of a faction that favours reconciliation with Rome on the basis of the Campos precedent, a program which is reportedly opposed by the other bishops of the SSPX.

In a letter that he addressed to the Catholic bishops of Germany in October 2008, Schmidberger rejected the description that Pope John Paul II had applied to the Jews: "our older brothers in the faith", and declared that "for as long as they do not distance themselves from their forefathers' guilt through the avowal of Christ's divinity and baptism, they are complicit in the deicide".
