= Superior General of the Society of Saint Pius X =

Position within the Society of Saint Pius X

- Coat of arms of the Society of Saint Pius X
- Incumbent; The Rev. Fr. Davide Pagliarani FSSPX since July 11, 2018
- Abbreviation: SG
- Member of: Society of Saint Pius X
- Residence: General House, Menzingen, Switzerland
- Term length: 12 years
- First holder: Marcel Lefebvre

Superior General of the Society of Saint Pius X is the title given to the head of the traditionalist Society of Saint Pius X (or SSPX) founded by Archbishop Marcel Lefebvre in 1970.

== History ==
The Society of Saint Pius X was founded in 1970, and Archbishop Lefebvre became interim Superior General. In this time, he wrote the Constitution of the Society of Saint Pius X. The Superior General resides at the SSPX General House in Menzingen, Switzerland.

The Society of Saint Pius X meets every twelve years at their general chapter to elect a new Superior General or vote to reelect the current Superior General.

== Current Superior General ==
On July 11, 2018, Davide Pagliarani was elected for a 12 year term as Superior General of the Society of Saint Pius X. This position was previously held by Bishop Bernard Fellay, a Swiss Catholic Bishop.

Davide Pagliarani was ordained a priest in 1996.

== List of Superiors General ==
No.	Name	Portrait	Took office	Birthplace (Note: Lists the present-day name and nationality of the city in question.)
1	Marcel Lefebvre		1970	Tourcoing, France
2	Franz Schmidberger		1982	Riedlingen, Germany
3	Bernard Fellay		1994	Sierre, Switzerland
4	Davide Pagliarani		2018	Rimini, Italy
