= GREC =

GREC may refer to:

- Greenpoint Renaissance Enterprise Corporation, a consortium of neighborhood organizations in North Brooklyn
- Group for Reflection among Catholics, a dialogue among traditionalist Catholics in France
