= The Angelus (magazine) =

American religious magazine (founded 1978)

The Angelus is the official English language magazine for the Society of Saint Pius X. It is a bi-monthly magazine published by the Society of St. Pius X in the United States. It was founded by Carl Pulvermacher in 1978 in Dickinson, Texas. The offices and printing facilities were moved to Kansas City, Missouri in 1990. It is currently published by John Fullerton.

The magazine contains articles relating to Church history and social teaching. It also regularly has articles on current activities of the Society and its relationship with the Vatican. One popular, regular feature is the "Questions and Answers," which answers questions on doctrine and practice.
