= SSPX Resistance =

Group of traditionalist Catholics

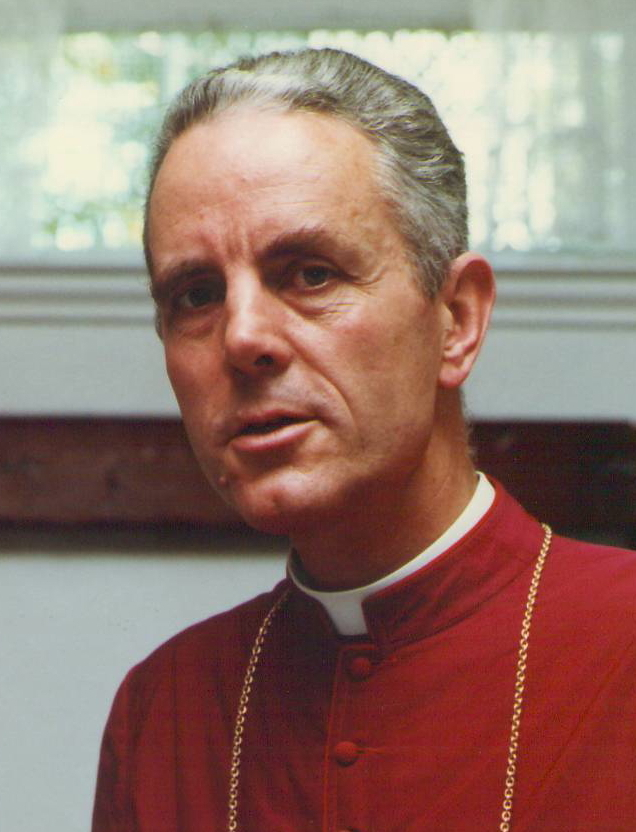
Bishop Richard Williamson, founder of the SSPX Resistance, in 1991

The SSPX Resistance is a loosely organized group of traditionalist Catholics, founded by Bishop Richard Williamson, which broke away from the Society of Saint Pius X (SSPX).

== History ==
Bishop Williamson was expelled from the SSPX in 2012. Prior to his expulsion, Williamson had been convicted of Holocaust denial by a German court in 2010. After Williamson left the SSPX, the priests and faithful who followed him were dubbed the "SSPX Resistance."

In his discussions with the SSPX, Pope Benedict XVI had indicated a willingness to grant the Society canonical recognition. Certain priests within the SSPX accused their superiors of abandoning the group's traditional principles, for considering this offer of canonical recognition.

The SSPX itself was established by Archbishop Marcel Lefebvre in 1970 in opposition to the changes brought by the Second Vatican Council.

The Resistance cannot be defined as sedevacantist, as it strictly adopts the "Recognize and Resist" (R&R) position also affirmed by the mainline SSPX.

== Episcopal Consecrations ==
Bishop Williamson consecrated five bishops to serve the Resistance. The first bishop he consecrated was Jean-Michael Faure in 2015. Williamson later consecrated Tomás de Aquino Ferreira da Costa, Gerardo Zendejas, Giacomo Ballini, Michał Stobnicki and Paul Morgan. Williamson's 2017 consecration of Zendejas, at St. Athanasius Church in Vienna, Virginia drew condemnation from the local bishop.

Williamson also performed a conditional consecration of Archbishop Carlo Maria Viganò.

== Structure ==
There are also Resistance chapels in Ireland, headquartered in Cork, overseen by Bishop Giacomo Ballini. Regarding the Masses held in Derry, Bishop Donal McKeown warned the faithful: "The priests of SSPX Resistance Ireland are not in full communion with the Catholic Church and do not accept the full teaching authority of the Church."

The SSPX Resistance also has a presence in England, including in London, Kent, and Berkshire.

=== Affiliated religious orders ===
Traditional group called "Dominicans of Avrillé", France, who were formerly affiliated with the SSPX, have aligned themselves with the SSPX Resistance.

The Benedictine Monastery of the Holy Cross in Nova Friburgo, Rio de Janeiro, Brazil is directly aligned with the Resistance. This is also where Bishop Williamson consecrated Father Jean-Michel Faure as a Bishop on March 19, 2015.

== See also ==
- SSPX-affiliated religious orders
