= Davide Pagliarani =

Italian Traditionalist Catholic priest (born 1970)

Davide Pagliarani SSPX
- Superior General of the Society of Saint Pius X
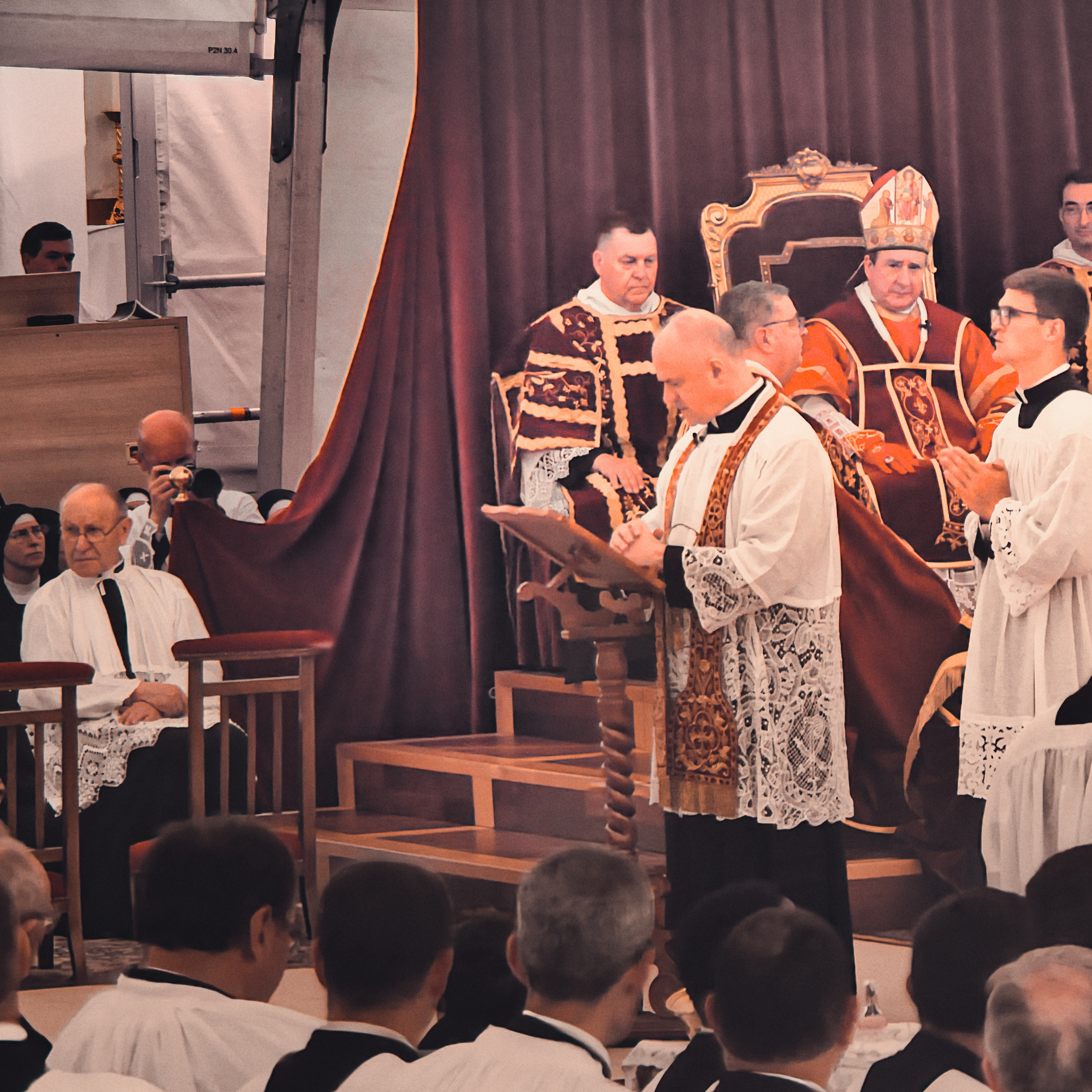
- Pagliarani during the 2026 Écône consecrations
- Church: Society of St. Pius X
- Elected: 11 July 2018
- Predecessor: Bernard Fellay

Orders
- Ordination: 27 June 1996 by Bernard Fellay

Personal details
- Born: 25 October 1970 (age 56) Rimini, Italy
- Education: Flavigny-sur-Ozerain Seminary

Davide Pagliarani FSSPX (born on 25 October 1970) is an Italian traditionalist Catholic priest and the current Superior General of the Society of Saint Pius X (SSPX).

== Biography ==
Pagliarani was born in Rimini, Italy. He later entered the SSPX's seminary in Flavigny-sur-Ozerain in 1989. After his studies, he completed military service. Pagliarani was ordained a priest of the SSPX on 27 June 1996 by the former Superior General, Bishop Bernard Fellay.

Pagliarani ministered in Rimini for seven years then was transferred for an extension of three years to Singapore. He later served as superior of the District of Italy between 2006 and 2012, becoming rector of the Seminary of Our Lady the Co-Redemptrix (Spanish: Nuestra Señora de la Co-Redentora) in Buenos Aires, Argentina, from 2012.

On 11 July 2018, Pagliarani was elected superior general of the Society for a term of 12 years, succeeding Bishop Bernard Fellay.

On 2 July 2026, Pagliarani was excommunicated from the Catholic Church as a consequence of the schismatic episcopal consecrations of Écône.

== Views ==
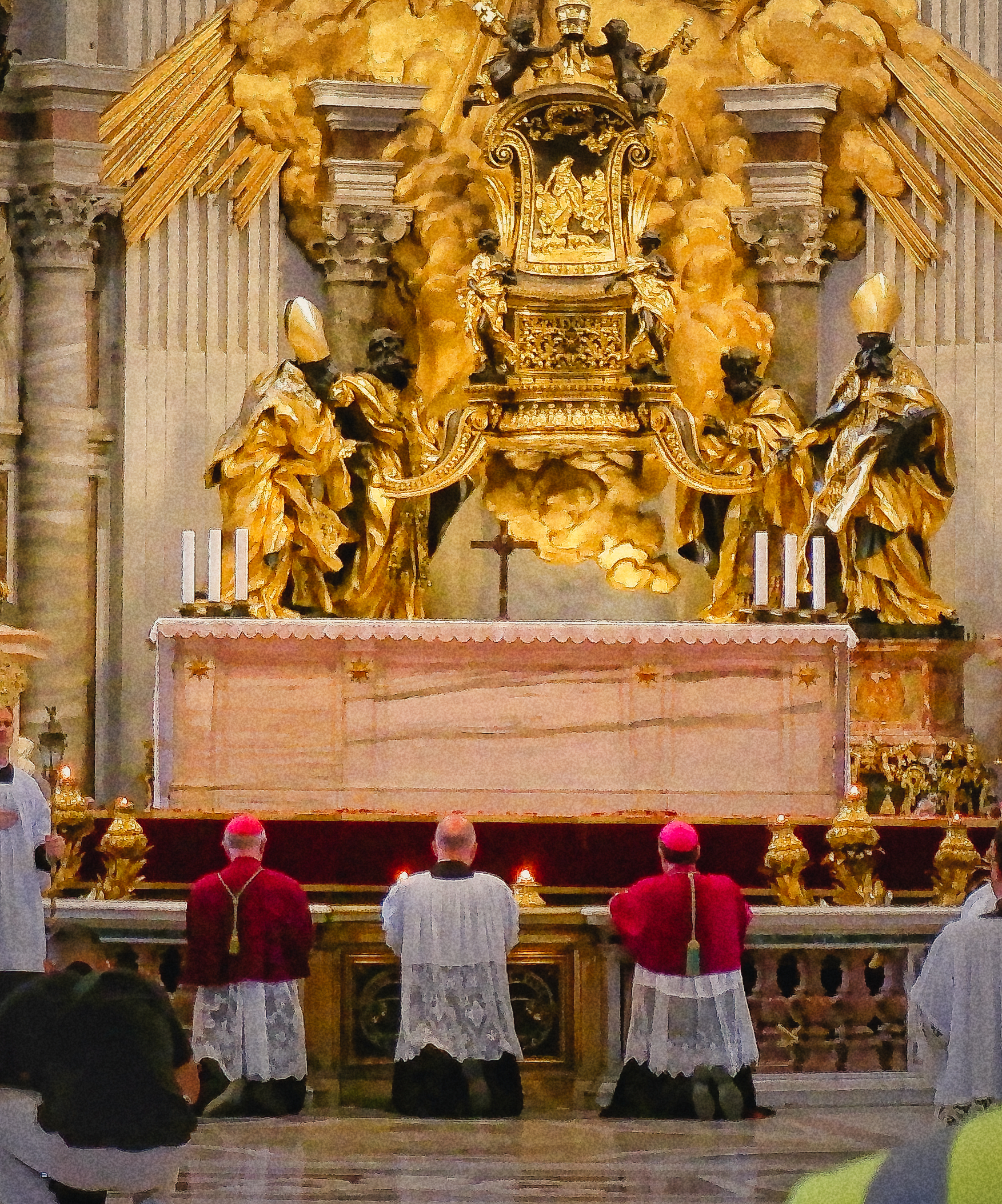
Pagliarani in 2025 (centre) at the Altar of the Chair of Saint Peter during a pilgrimage in Rome

Pagliarani is an outspoken critic of Pope Francis. Even before his election as superior general, he had already criticized and denounced Francis' 2016 apostolic exhortation Amoris laetitia. Following the events that occurred at the 2019 Amazon synod, Pagliarani called for "a day of prayer and reparation" and called the synod "demonic" and "idolatrous."

In October 2020, Pagliarani criticized the Papal encyclical Laudato si' for its reduction of Christian sanctity to environmentalism, ecumenism of the Document on Human Fraternity and its extension to the Papal encyclical Fratelli Tutti.

Pagliarani lamented on the motu proprio Traditionis custodes promulgated by Francis in July 2021 restricting the use of the Tridentine Mass. In a sermon delivered at Mass on 18 July 2021, Pagliarani asked, "Why is this Mass the 'apple of discord'? Why does this Mass divide?" and criticized the pope once more, saying, "The pope and his accomplices are the jail guards of tradition. They are guardians of the zoo." Pagliarani also issued a communiqué regarding the motu proprio in which he stated, "This Mass, our Mass, must really be for us like the pearl of great price in the Gospel, for which we are ready to renounce everything, for which we are ready to sell everything."

== Consecration of SSPX bishops ==
On 2 February 2026, during the ceremony of receiving the cassocks which he presided at the Saint-Curé-d'Ars International Seminary in Flavigny-sur-Ozerain, he announced that new consecrations of bishops would take place on 1 July. On 12 February, Pagliarani met Cardinal Víctor Manuel Fernández, the head of the Dicastery for the Doctrine of the Faith. The dicastery stated their openness to begin talks with the SSPX, while warning against the planned consecrations. On 18 February 2026, Pagliarani sent a letter to Cardinal Fernández, where he confirmed the consecrations were to take place on 1 July, even without a papal mandate. On 1 July, the consecrations took place, resulting in a Vatican declaration of his automatic excommunication, together with SSPX clergy and any laity who "formally adhere" to the Society. In an open letter of 3 July, Pagliarini disputed that he had been excommunicated, describing the sanctions against him and the SSPX as "unjust and invalid."
