= Michel Lelong =

French Catholic priest (1925–2020)

M. Afr. Michel Lelong

Orders
- Ordination: 1948

Personal details
- Born: 25 February 1925 Angers, France
- Died: 10 April 2020 (aged 95) Paris, France
- Denomination: Roman Catholicism

Michel Joseph Marie Lelong (25 February 1925 – 10 April 2020) was a French Catholic priest, known in particular for his involvement in Islamic-Christian dialogue.

== Life ==
Lelong was born into a Catholic family. His father was a resistance fighter from the start, joining Charles de Gaulle in London during World War II. Lelong found his spiritual calling in 1940 after seeing a film about Charles de Foucauld and entered the diocesan seminary in Angers. After a year he continued his theological training with the Society of Missionaries of Africa. In 1948 he was ordained a priest in Carthage, Tunisia. He lived in the Maghreb for over twenty years, where he worked, among other things, at the cultural center of the White Fathers in Tunis. In 1975, he took over the management of relations with Islam in the Bishops' Conference of France. Among other things, he was involved in the Association du Groupe des foyers islamo-chrétiens. In 1993 he founded the Groupe d’amité islamo-chrétienne (GAIC), where he held the presidency together with the Algerian intellectual Mustapha Cherif. Lelong has written numerous works on the interreligious relations of Christianity and Islam.

For his work for the Islamic-Christian dialogue, he was awarded the Ordre national du Mérite (officer) and accepted into the Legion of Honor (knight).

An appeal caused a sensation, which he signed in 1982 together with the pastor Étienne Mathiot and the philosopher Roger Garaudy in view of the 1982 Lebanon War and which was criticized for his sharp anti-Zionist statements. Later he defended his friend Garaudy together with the well-known "poor priest" Abbé Pierre after his work Les mythes fondateurs de la politique israëlienne (“The founding myths of Israeli politics”) had been published. Although he did not agree with his holocaust-denying statements, he had the right to represent this. In 2007, he attended the funeral of former minister Maurice Papon, who was convicted of his involvement in the deportation of French Jews in Vichy France, because he was always convinced of Papon's innocence. He also advocated a dialogue with the traditionalist Society of Saint Pius X and declared his admiration for the Islamist preacher Tariq Ramadan.

On 10 April 2020, Lelong died at the age of 95 during the COVID-19 pandemic in France at the Lariboisière Hospital in Paris as a result of a COVID-19 infection.
