= Personal Apostolic Administration of Saint John Mary Vianney =

Brazilian Catholic organization dedicated to the Latin Mass

Personal Apostolic Administration of Saint John Mary Vianney, Campos Administratio Apostolica Personalis Sancti Ioannis Mariae Vianney

Location
- Country: Brazil
- Metropolitan: Immediately Subject to the Holy See

Statistics
- Area: 12,520 km^{2} (4,830 sq mi)
- Population: Total: (as of 2004); 986,000
- Parishes: 14

Information
- Sui iuris church: Latin Church
- Rite: Latin Rite (Extraordinary Form)
- Established: January 18, 2002; 24 years ago
- Cathedral: Igreja do Imaculado Coração de Nossa Senhora do Rosário de Fátima
- Secular priests: 38

Current leadership
- Pope: Leo XIV
- Apostolic Administrator: Fernando Arêas Rifan

Website
- https://www.adapostolica.org/

The Personal Apostolic Administration of Saint John Mary Vianney (Latin: Administratio Apostolica Personalis Sancti Ioannis Mariae Vianney) was established on 18 January 2002 by Pope John Paul II for traditionalist Catholic clergy and laity within the Diocese of Campos in Brazil. It is the only personal apostolic administration in existence, and the only canonically regular Catholic Church jurisdiction devoted exclusively to celebrating the Tridentine Mass in the area. Its current Apostolic Administrator is Bishop Fernando Arêas Rifan.

== Origins ==
From 3 January 1949 to 29 August 1981, the Diocese of Campos was headed by Bishop Antônio de Castro Mayer, who opposed the use there of Pope Paul VI's revision of the Roman Missal and held to the Tridentine Mass. After his resignation, the then 77-year-old Bishop Castro Mayer continued to lead opposition in the diocese to the revised liturgy and on 30 June 1988 joined with Archbishop Marcel Lefebvre in consecrating as bishops, against an express prohibition by Pope John Paul II, four priests of the Society of St. Pius X. For this action he was declared to have incurred excommunication.

The priests of Campos who shared his traditionalist Catholic views formed themselves into the Priestly Union of Saint Jean-Marie Vianney, also known as the Sacerdotal Society of St. John Marie Vianney (SSJV) and, when Bishop de Castro Mayer died in April 1991, chose as his successor Licínio Rangel, who was given episcopal consecration later that year by three bishops of the Society of St. Pius X.

== Reconciliation with the Holy See ==
Together with the Society of Saint Pius X, the Campos group of priests made a pilgrimage to Rome during the Jubilee Year 2000 and was welcomed by Cardinal Darío Castrillón Hoyos, President of the Pontifical Commission Ecclesia Dei, with a lunch and dialogue. They decided to seek reconciliation with the Holy See and, on 15 August 2001, wrote a letter to Pope John Paul II in which the "whole Union renewed the profession of Catholic faith, declaring full communion with the Chair of Peter, recognising 'his Primacy and the government of the universal Church, her pastors and her faithful', and likewise declaring: 'For no reason do we wish to be separated from the Rock (Peter) on which Jesus Christ founded his Church'".

On Christmas Day (25 December), 2001, Pope John Paul II responded with an autograph letter telling the priests that, "warmly consenting to your request to be received into the full communion of the Catholic Church, we canonically recognise that you belong to her." The Pope also removed the excommunication of Bishop Rangel for his illicit episcopal ordination.

When the necessary legislation had been drawn up, the Pope then established for the Campos group, with effect from 18 January 2002, the Personal Apostolic Administration of Saint John Mary Vianney, with authority over those Catholics in the Diocese of Campos who wished to use the Roman Rite in the form it had before the revisions following the Second Vatican Council. On the date of entry into effect of the new arrangement, a ceremony was held in the Cathedral of Campos on Friday 18 January. The Papal Letter was presented to Bishop Rangel in the course of the celebration, by Darío Cardinal Castrillón Hoyos, President of the Pontifical Commission Ecclesia Dei.

== Subsequent history ==
During the 1980s and 1990s, some claimed that followers of the Priestly Union of Saint Jean-Marie Vianney constituted the majority of the Catholics of Campos, who had never known the revised Liturgy of the Mass, as their diocesan bishop Antônio de Castro Mayer had, during the 1970s, retained the Tridentine Mass in his territory. However, when at the end of 2003 separate statistics were, for the first time, gathered for the Diocese of Campos and the new personal apostolic administration, the latter reported 28,325 Catholics, 28 priests, 9 seminarians, 75 religious sisters and 24 schools, while the diocese reported 854,000 Catholics, 48 diocesan and 17 religious priests, 30 seminarians, 19 religious brothers and 67 religious sisters, and 5 schools (Annuario Pontificio 2005). The corresponding figures seven years later were, for the personal apostolic administration, 30,733 Catholics, 32 priests, 7 seminarians, 38 religious sisters and 24 schools, and for the diocese 940,000 Catholics, 69 diocesan and 16 religious priests, 27 seminarians, 18 religious brothers and 81 religious sisters and 18 schools.

In his letter of 25 December 2001, Pope John Paul II promised to ensure the episcopal succession of Bishop Licínio Rangel, and when Rangel asked that he be given an auxiliary bishop, recommended him to ask instead for a coadjutor, who would have the automatic right of succession. The Pope then, on 28 June 2002, appointed to that post Rangel's vicar general, Fernando Arêas Rifan, who automatically succeeded Rangel as Apostolic Administrator, when the latter died on 16 December 2002.

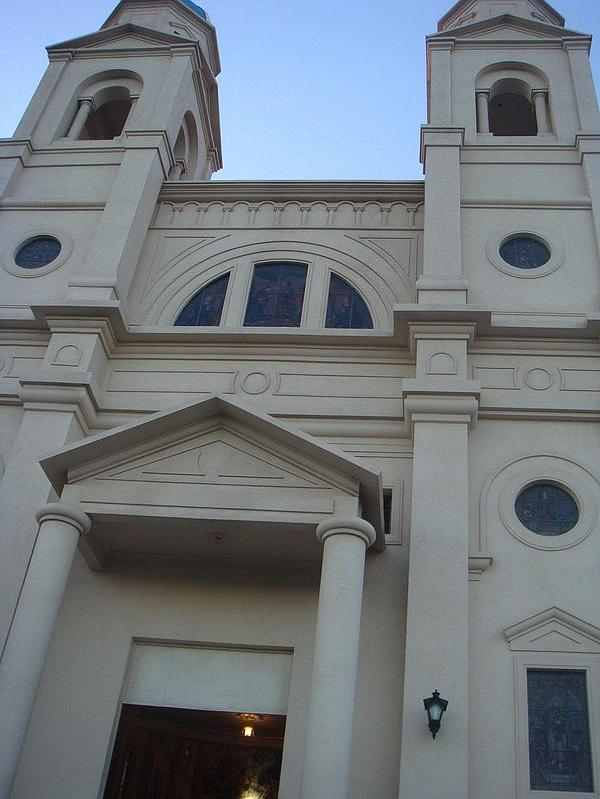
Main church at Campos, 2012

A group of traditionalist Catholics was thus accommodated fully within the Catholic Church. They accept the authority of the Pope as Vicar of Christ and Shepherd of the Church, the legitimacy of the Second Vatican Council and the validity of the Mass approved by Pope Paul VI. The clergy of the apostolic administration possess the faculty to celebrate in Latin the Mass, the sacraments and all other sacramental rites in the form codified by Pope Pius V and modified by his successors down to Pope John XXIII (in case of Good Friday liturgy by Pope Benedict XVI).

== Doctrinal stance ==
In his first pastoral letter, Rifan stressed the importance of the papal mandate given him. He also warned against heresy and praised the traditional Latin liturgy and liturgical discipline as a defense against it. He counseled members of the Apostolic Administration against schism, demonstrated by "a general taste for systematic criticism of Church authorities, a spirit of resistance, disobedience, disrespect, suspicion, backbiting, independence from the Church's Hierarchy and Magisterium, contentment with the abnormality of the situation, uncharitableness, a feeling of owning the whole of truth, a sectarian attitude that made us out to be the only good people".

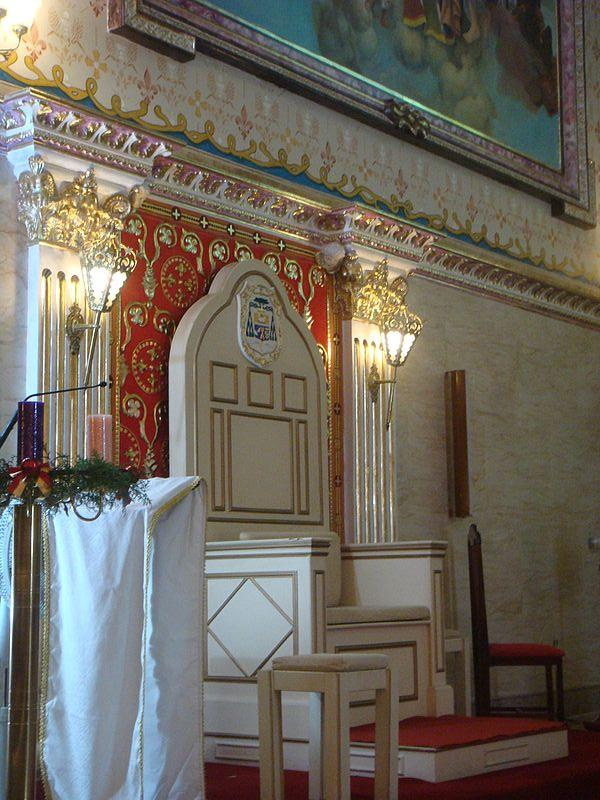
The Apostolic Administrator's episcopal cathedra. As Bishop and Ordinary, he can use all the episcopal insignia.

The Administration has produced a narrative history of the events leading to its conflict with the Holy See; it addresses the reconciliation and how it differs from the SSPX in a question and answer format.

In a 2005 interview, Castrillón Hoyos stated that there were cordial relations between the personal apostolic administration and the Diocese of Campos at all levels, and that priests of the apostolic administration were celebrating Mass in the older form for the traditionalist faithful in another dozen dioceses in Brazil in accordance with signed agreements that they had with the diocesan bishops.

== Personal Apostolic Administrators of Saint John Vianney ==
- Licínio Rangel (18 January 2002 – 16 December 2002)
- Fernando Arêas Rifan (16 December 2002 – present)
