= Roberto Francisco Ferrería Paz =

Roman Catholic bishop

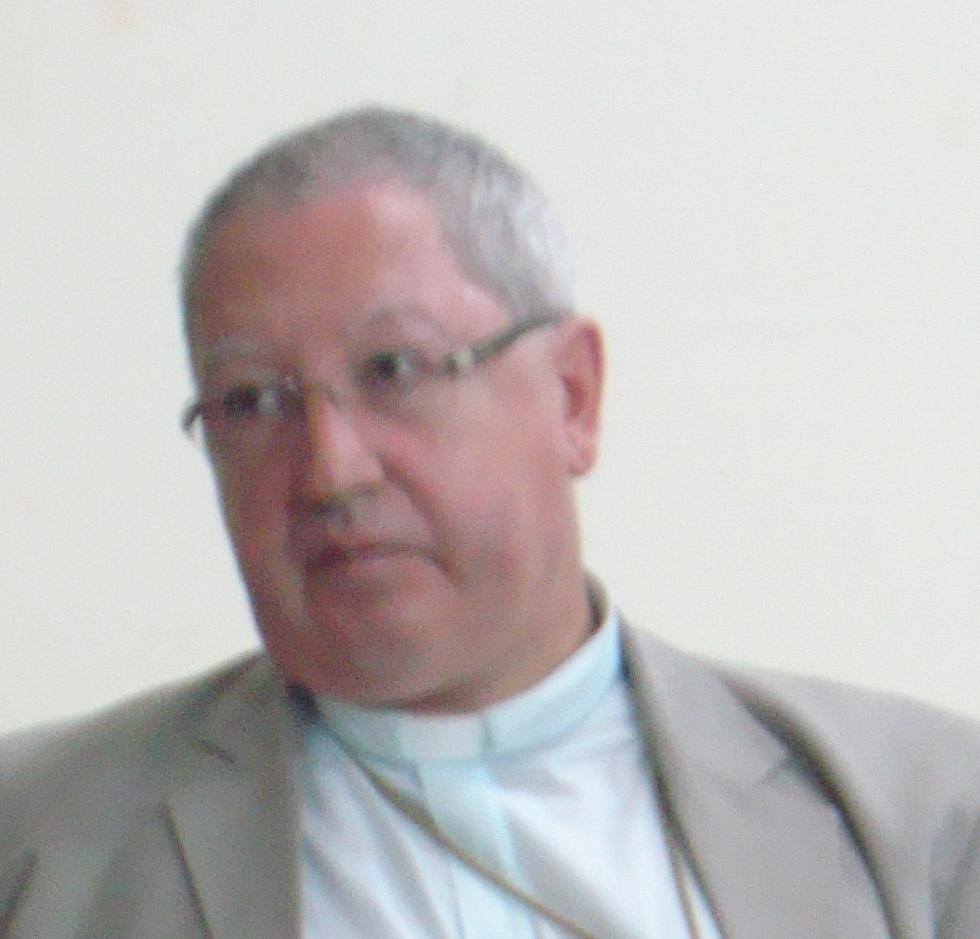
Roberto Francisco Ferrería Paz in January 2010.

Roberto Francisco Ferrería Paz (born 5 June 1953) is a Uruguayan Brazilian Roman Catholic bishop and professor.

Ordained to the priesthood on 16 December 1989, Ferrería Paz was named bishop of the Diocese of Campos, Brazil on 19 December 2007. He was appointed Bishop of Campos, Rio de Janeiro on 8 June 2011.
