= João Corso =

Brazilian Roman Catholic bishop

João Corso S.D.B.
- Emerit Bishop of Roman Catholic Diocese of Campos
- Church: Roman Catholic Church
- See: Diocese of Campos
- In office: 1999–2008
- Predecessor: Carlos Alberto Etchandy Gimeno Navarro
- Successor: Roberto Gomes Guimarães

Orders
- Ordination: August 30, 1953
- Consecration: December 8, 1990 by Carlos Alberto Etchandy Gimeno Navarro

Personal details
- Born: 30 March 1928 Cajobi, Brazil
- Died: 15 October 2014 (aged 86) São Paulo, Brazil

Styles of João Corso S.D.B.
- Reference style: The Most Reverend
- Spoken style: Your Excellency
- Religious style: Monsignor
- Posthumous style: none

João Corso, S.D.B. (March 30, 1928 – October 15, 2014) was a Brazilian Salesian who led the Diocese of Campos from 1990 to 1995.

Ordained to the priesthood on August 30, 1953, he was named bishop of the Roman Catholic Diocese of Campos, Brazil on October 12, 1990, and was ordained bishop on December 8, 1990. He resigned on November 22, 1995.
