= Society of Saint Pius X =

Traditionalist Catholic priestly fraternity

- Fraternitas Sacerdotalis Sancti Pii X
- Logo of the Society of Saint Pius X, depicting two interlocked, crowned hearts
- Abbreviation: SSPX; FSSPX (official)
- Orientation: Traditionalist Catholicism
- Superior General: Davide Pagliarani
- Bishops: 6
- Seminarians: 264
- Brothers: 145
- Sisters: 250
- Liturgy: Tridentine Mass
- Headquarters: Menzingen, Switzerland
- Founder: Marcel Lefebvre
- Origin: 1 November 1970; 56 years ago
- Separated from: Catholic Church (1988-2009, 2026-present)
- Members: 1,482 personnel
- Priests: 733
- Other names: Priestly Fraternity of Saint Pius X; Fraternité Sacerdotale Saint-Pie-X
- Official website: fsspx.org/en
- Numbers include 6 bishops, 733 priests, 264 seminarians, 145 brothers, 88 oblates, and 250 sisters.

The Society of Saint Pius X (SSPX; Latin: Fraternitas Sacerdotalis Sancti Pii X, lit. 'Priestly Fraternity of Saint Pius X', FSSPX) is a traditionalist Catholic organization founded in 1970 by Archbishop Marcel Lefebvre. Considered schismatic by the Catholic Church, the society comprises priests and seminarians and is associated with a worldwide network of chapels, schools, religious communities, and lay supporters. It is known for its opposition to several reforms associated with the Second Vatican Council. Adherents to the SSPX are called Lefebvrists, Lefebvrians, or Lefebvrites, terms SSPX rejects.

The Holy See formally declared the SSPX and its adherents (Note: Under Catholic canon law (canon 1364 §1), "formal adherence to the schism" incurs automatic excommunication. A 1996 Vatican explanatory note defines this adherence for laypeople as requiring both an internal disposition (consciously "sharing the substance of the schism" over papal obedience) and its external manifestation (most visibly through exclusively attending SSPX liturgies). Occasional attendance without a schismatic disposition does not incur the penalty, meaning lay situations are evaluated on a case-by-case basis. For SSPX clergy, however, their active ministry is considered an "undoubted" sign of formal adherence, resulting in automatic excommunication.) to be in schism and excommunicated them in 1988 and in 2026, each time following illicit consecrations of bishops by the SSPX. The SSPX considers itself never to have been excommunicated nor to be or have been in schism.

Named after Pope Pius X for his anti-modernist stance, the society retains the Tridentine Mass and pre-Vatican II liturgical books in Latin. It has more than 700 priests among 1,482 total members. Estimates of the number of laypeople who attend SSPX Masses vary significantly.

== History ==
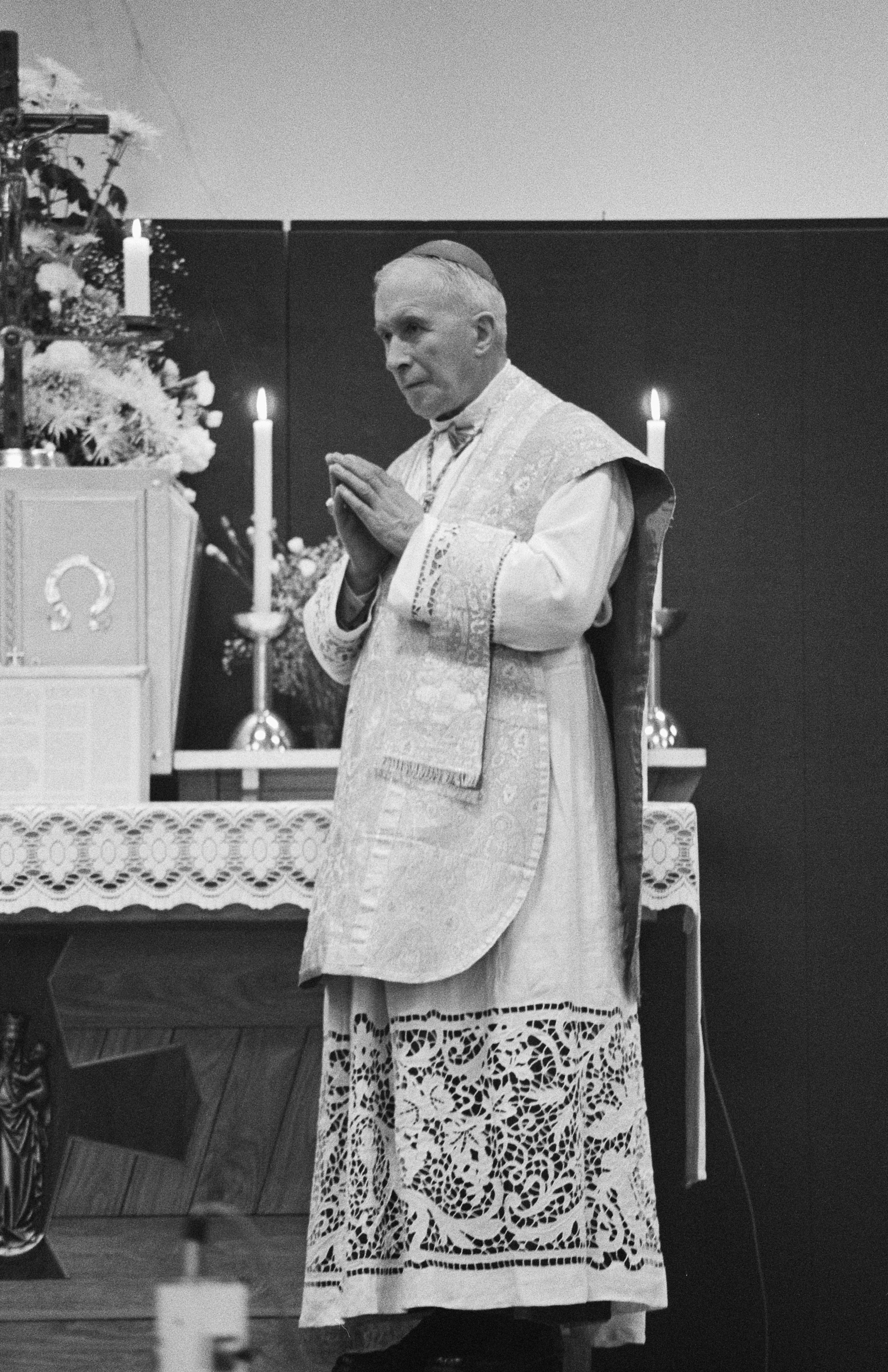
Lefebvre, the society's founder, celebrating the Traditional Latin Mass

Like Traditionalist Catholicism in general, SSPX was born out of an attachment to many elements that they sought to preserve despite the changes in the Catholic Church that followed the Second Vatican Council (1962–1965). The founder and central figure of the society was the French Archbishop Marcel Lefebvre, who had served the Catholic Church as Apostolic Delegate for French-speaking Africa, Archbishop of Dakar, and Superior General of the Congregation of the Holy Spirit, a missionary order of priests.

=== Foundation of the Society ===
In September 1970, shortly after his retirement as Superior General of the Congregation of the Holy Spirit, Lefebvre was approached by eleven members of the Pontifical French Seminary in Rome, who asked him to help them find a seminary with a more traditional formation. They sought Lefebvre's advice on a conservative seminary where they could complete their studies. He directed them to the University of Fribourg, in Switzerland.

In late 1970, Lefebvre was urged by the abbot of Hauterive Abbey and the Dominican theologian Marie-Dominique Philippe to teach the seminarians personally but he felt he was too old to undertake such a large project, and told them he would visit François Charrière, Bishop of Lausanne, Geneva and Fribourg, with a request to set up a religious society. He told them that if he agreed to go through with it, he would see in it a sign of Divine Providence. Charrière granted Lefebvre's request. With a document predated six days to 1 November 1970, he established the Pius Union under the official title of the Apostles of Jesus and Mary. It was also given the civil title, the Society of Saint Pius X.. It was a pia unio (Latin, for "pius union"/"holy union") on a ad experimentum ("provisional"/"experimental") basis for six years. The Society of Saint Pius X was formally founded, adhered to all canonical norms, and received the episcopal blessing and encouragement of the local ordinary. Some Swiss laymen offered the International Seminary of Saint Pius X at Écône to the newly formed group, and in 1971 the first 24 candidates entered, followed by a further 32 in October 1972.

=== 1974: canonical visitation of the seminary, Lefebvre's declaration ===
On 11 November 1974, two apostolic visitors from the Holy See came to the Seminary of St. Pius X in Écône. The SPPX claims that the seminarians and staff at Écône were shocked by some alleged "scandalous opinions" expressed by the two priests, such as "the ordination of married men will soon be a normal thing, truth changes with the times, and the traditional conception of the Resurrection of our Lord is open to discussion". In response to this, in November 1974, Lefebvre wrote a declaration denouncing what he considered liberal trends "clearly evident" in the council and in the subsequent reforms.

=== Canonical suppression of the SSPX and its aftermath ===
On 24 January 1975, Bishop Pierre Mamie, Charrière's successor as bishop of Fribourg, petitioned the Sacred Congregation for Religious in Rome to suppress SSPX's status as a pia unio, even before the end of its six-year experimental period. The reason given was the November 1974 declaration of Lefebvre. The congregation's prefect, Cardinal Arturo Tabera, replied on 25 April 1975, stating that Mamie had the authority to withdraw his predecessor's approval and that the congregation agreed SSPX should be suppressed immediately. In the same period, Lefebvre was summoned to the Vatican, meeting with the cardinals on 13 February and 3 March.

On 6 May 1975, with the cardinals' approval, Bishop Mamie formally withdrew SSPX's pious union status. On the same day, a commission of cardinals that had interviewed Lefebvre in January issued a separate letter, approved by Pope Paul VI, detailing the conditions of the suppression.

SSPX continued to operate in spite its canonical suppression.

In the consistory of 24 May 1976, Pope Paul VI rebuked Archbishop Lefebvre by name, and appealed to him and his followers to change their minds.

On 1 July 1976, the Press Office of the Holy See declared that following canon 2373 of the then-Code of Canon Law, Lefebvre was automatically suspended for one year from conferring ordination and that those whom he had ordained were automatically suspended from exercising the order received. It was also announced that the Holy See was examining Lefebvre's disobedience to the Pope's orders.

On 11 July 1976, Lefebvre signed a certificate of receipt of a letter from Cardinal Sebastiano Baggio, Prefect of the Congregation for Bishops, intimating that further penalties would be imposed per canon 2331 §1 of the then Code of Canon Law concerning obstinate disobedience to legitimate precepts or prohibitions of the Roman Pontiff. He was enjoined, within ten days of receipt of the letter, to take steps "to repair the scandal caused." In a letter of 17 July to Pope Paul VI, Lefebvre declared that he judged his action of 29 June to be legitimate. The Pope considered this response inadequate, and on his instructions, the Congregation for Bishops, on 22 July 1976, suspended Lefebvre for an indefinite time from all exercise of holy orders: he could not confer any of the Sacraments, save Reconciliation or Baptism in an emergency (suspension a divinis).

=== Écône consecrations of 1988 ===
A central controversy surrounding SSPX concerns the consecration by Archbishop Lefebvre and Brazilian bishop Antônio de Castro Mayer of four SSPX priests as bishops in 1988, in violation of the orders of Pope John Paul II.

By 1987, Archbishop Lefebvre was 81. If he had died at that point, SSPX could have had their members ordained to the priesthood only at the hands of non-SSPX bishops, regarded by Lefebvre as unreliable and unorthodox. In June 1987, Lefebvre announced his intention to consecrate a successor to the episcopacy. He implied that he intended to do this with or without the approval of the Holy See. (Note: "The situation is such, the work placed in our hands by the good Lord is such, that faced with this darkness in Rome, faced with the Roman authorities' pertinacity in error, faced with this refusal to return to truth or tradition on the part of those who occupy the seats of authority in Rome, faced with all these things, it seems to us that the good Lord is asking for the Church to continue. This is why it is likely that before I give account of my life to the good Lord, I shall have to consecrate some bishops" (Sermon on 29 June 1987)) In the Catholic Church, a bishop requires the mandate of the Pope if he is to consecrate a bishop, (Note: "No bishop is permitted to consecrate anyone a bishop unless it is first evident that there is a pontifical mandate" (Code of Canon Law, canon 1013)) and an unauthorized consecration automatically incurs excommunication. (Note: "A bishop who consecrates someone a bishop without a pontifical mandate and the person who receives the consecration from him incur a latae sententiae excommunication reserved to the Apostolic See" (Code of Canon Law, canon 1382).)

Earlier, Pope Pius XII, in his encyclical Ad Apostolorum principis, had described the sacramental activity of bishops who had been consecrated without papal approval as "gravely illicit, that is, criminal and sacrilegious".

On 5 May 1988, a skeleton agreement between Lefebvre and Cardinal Joseph Ratzinger, the prefect of the Congregation for the Doctrine of the Faith (and future Pope Benedict XVI) was signed.

On Pope John Paul II's instructions, Cardinal Ratzinger replied to Lefebvre on 27 May, insisting on the observance of the 5 May agreement and adding that, if Lefebvre carried out unauthorized consecrations on 30 June, the promised authorization for the ordination to the episcopacy would be withdrawn.

On 2 June, Lefebvre wrote to Pope John Paul II that he intended to proceed with his consecrations. On 9 June, the Pope replied with a personal letter, appealing to him to abandon a design that "would be seen as nothing other than a schismatic act, the theological and canonical consequences of which are known to you".

External videos
- Associated Press report on the Écône consecrations, 4 July 1988

On 30 June 1988, Archbishop Lefebvre proceeded to ordain to the episcopate four priests of SSPX. Antônio de Castro Mayer, the retired Bishop of Campos in Brazil, assisted in the ceremony. Those consecrated as Bishops were: Bernard Fellay, Bernard Tissier de Mallerais, Alfonso de Galarreta, and Richard Williamson.

The following day, the Congregation for Bishops issued a decree declaring that Archbishop Lefebvre and the four newly ordained bishops had incurred the automatic canonical penalty of excommunication reserved to the Holy See. On the following day, 2 July, Pope John Paul II issued an apostolic letter known as Ecclesia Dei in which he condemned the Archbishop's action. The Pope stated that, since schism is defined in the 1983 Code of Canon Law as "withdrawal of submission to the Supreme Pontiff or from communion with the members of the Church subject to him" (canon 751), the consecration "constitute[d] a schismatic act", and that, by virtue of canon 1382 of the Code, it entailed ipso facto excommunication for all the bishops involved.

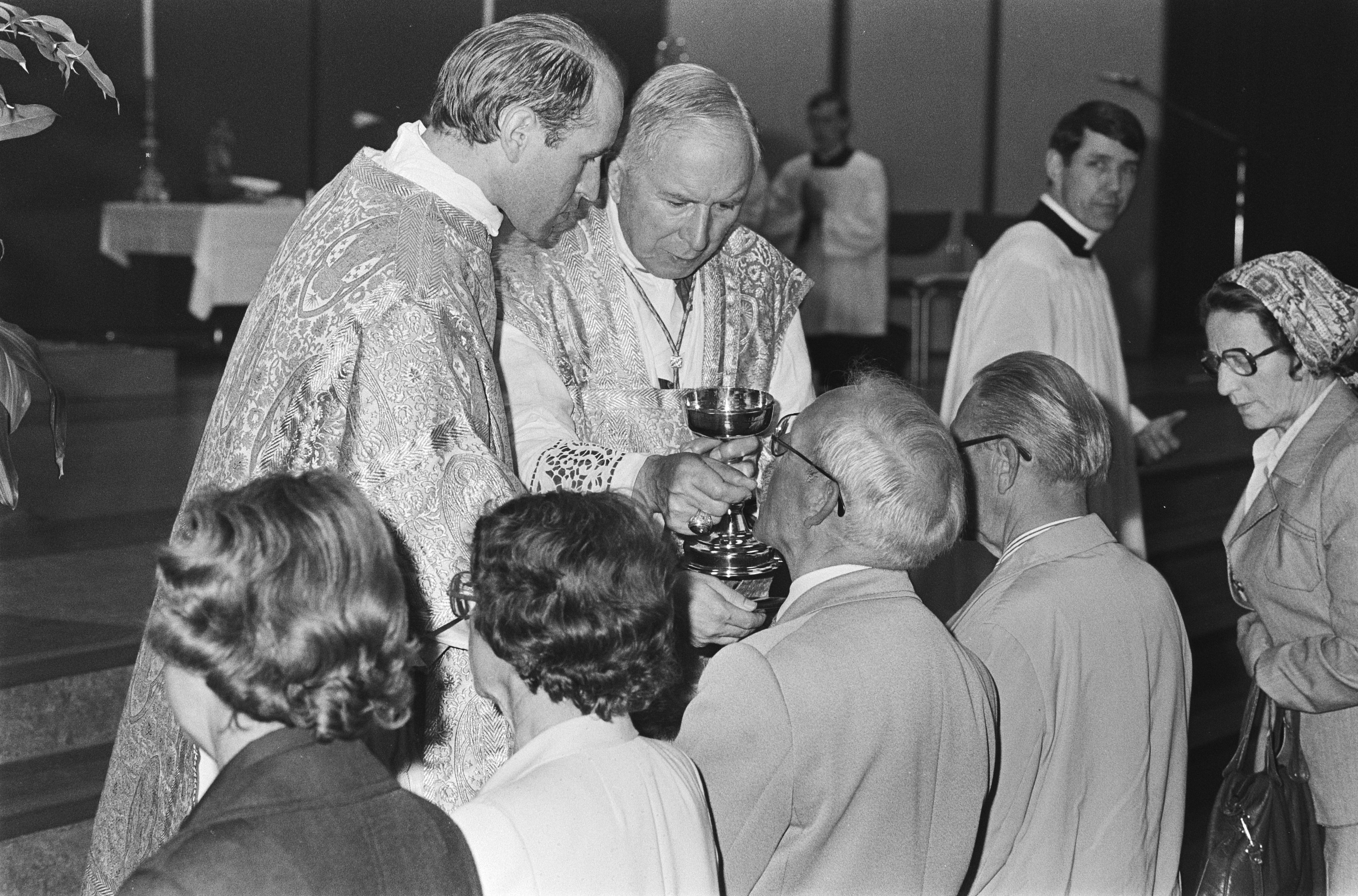
Veldhoven, Archbishop Lefebvre giving Communion assisted by Franz Schmidberger

Some members of SSPX disassociated themselves from the society as a result of Lefebvre's actions and, with the approval of the Holy See, formed a separate society called the Priestly Fraternity of Saint Peter.

Bishop Antônio de Castro Mayer resigned as Bishop of Campos on 20 August 1981; he later participated in the 1988 Écône consecrations, declaring "my presence here at this ceremony is a matter of conscience: It is the duty of a profession of the Catholic Faith before the entire Church." After his retirement, Bishop Mayer founded the Priestly Union of Saint John Mary Vianney (SSJV). Under the leadership of his successor, Bishop Licínio Rangel, the SSJV was reconstituted in January 2002 by Pope John Paul II as the Personal Apostolic Administration of Saint John Mary Vianney, with the same territory as the Diocese of Campos.

=== Discussions with the Holy See (1988–2017) ===
Archbishop Lefebvre died in 1991.

At the express request of the 4 bishops consecrated in 1988, in 2009 the Holy See remitted the excommunications of the SSPX's bishops that it had declared at the time of the 1988 consecrations, and expressed the hope that all members of the society would follow this up by speedily returning to full communion with the church.

Discussions since then have been complex, stemming from the society's insistence that the teachings of the Second Vatican Council on ecumenism, religious liberty, and collegiality are inconsistent with Catholic teaching and doctrine, a claim that the Holy See views as unacceptable, but recent discussions have indicated the possibility of an understanding. In an interview on 4 March 2017 with DICI, the official news organ of the society, Bishop Bernard Fellay stated:

Whether it is a question of religious liberty, collegiality, ecumenism, the new Mass, or even the new rites of the sacraments [...] And now all of a sudden, on these points that have been stumbling blocks, the emissaries from Rome tell us that they are open questions.

In the same month of March 2017, Archbishop Guido Pozzo, the prelate in charge of the Pontifical Commission Ecclesia Dei, the Roman Curia's organ for traditionalist societies, stated that the Holy See and the society were close to an agreement regularizing the society's status. In a letter of the same month, it was announced that Pope Francis authorized diocesan bishops to grant to SSPX priests faculties to officiate at a marriage valid in the Catholic Church in cases where no priest in good standing could do so.

In July 2017 Bishop Fellay signed a document along with a number of other clergy and academics labelled as a "Filial Correction" of Pope Francis. In the twenty-five-page document, which was made public in September after receiving no reply from the Holy See, they criticized the Pope for allegedly promoting heresy through various words, actions and omissions during his pontificate.

=== Expulsion of Bishop Williamson ===
In August 2012, Bishop Richard Williamson, one of those illicitly consecrated by Lefebvre, administered the sacrament of confirmation to about 100 laypeople at the Benedictine Monastery of the Holy Cross in Nova Friburgo, Brazil, during a visit to the State of Rio de Janeiro which had not been authorized by the Society's local leadership. The Society's South American district superior, Christian Bouchacourt, protested against his action on the Society's website, saying that it was "a serious act against the virtue of obedience."

In early October 2012, the leadership of the Society gave Williamson a deadline to declare his submission; instead, he published an "open letter" asking for the resignation of Bishop Bernard Fellay as Superior General of the Society. On 4 October 2012, the Society expelled Williamson in what it described as a "painful decision" citing the failures "to show respect and obedience deserved by his legitimate superiors".

=== Bishop Vitus Huonder ===
In May 2019, SSPX announced that Vitus Huonder, Bishop emeritus of Chur, Switzerland, as per a long-stated intention, had retired to one of the Society's houses in order "to dedicate himself to prayer and silence, to celebrate the traditional Mass exclusively, and to work for Tradition, the only way of renewing the Church." In 2015, Bishop Huonder was sent by then-prefect of the Congregation for the Doctrine of the Faith Gerhard Ludwig Müller to dialogue with SSPX. After four years Bishop Huonder was permitted by Pope Francis to go and live one of the Society's houses. He became a major supporter of the Society, reporting back positive things to Pope Francis and even producing a video titled "My journey to the SSPX – with Bishop Vitus Huonder" on YouTube. In that video, Huonder claimed that Pope Francis personally told him that SSPX is not in schism. The SSPX stated:

The Society of Saint Pius X appreciates Bishop Huonder's courageous decision and rejoices to be able to provide him with the spiritual and priestly surroundings that he desires so deeply. May this example be followed by others, so as to "restore everything in Christ".

Bishop Huonder died on 3 April 2024 at the age of 81, following serious illness. His funeral Mass on 17 April was celebrated by Bishop Fellay, and Huonder was buried at the International Seminary of Saint Pius X in Écône next to the tomb of Archbishop Marcel Lefebvre. Huonder's successor, Bishop Joseph Maria Bonnemain, attended the funeral, but did not take part in the celebration, due to the irregular canonical situation of SSPX.

=== Death of Bishop Tissier de Mallerais ===
On 28 September 2024, Bishop Bernard Tissier de Mallerais, another of the Bishops illicitely consecrated by Lefebvre, fell on the stairs of the Écône seminary, causing a skull fracture and an internal haemorrhage; he was promptly brought to the Hospital at Martigny and placed into an induced coma. He died on 8 October 2024, after 10 days of coma; his funeral was held at the International Seminary of Saint Pius X on 18 October.

The deaths of Bishops Huonder and Tissier de Mallerais, coupled with the expulsion and later death of Bishop Williamson, left Bernard Fellay and Alfonso de Galarreta the only remaining bishops affiliated with SSPX, prompting Catholic media to speculate whether the Society would proceed to new consecrations. In November 2024, Davide Pagliarani, General Superior of the Fraternity, explicitly mentioned this possibility for the future of FSSPX.

=== Écône consecrations of 2026 ===
On 2 February 2026, the Superior General announced their plans to proceed with consecrating bishops for the Society on 1 July 2026. The decision has been taken in harmony with the unanimous advice of his Council and has been publicly announced on occasion of the feast of the Purification of the ever Blessed Virgin, during a ceremony he presided over at the International Seminary of Saint-Curé d'Ars in Flavigny-sur-Ozerain, France.

On 12 February 2026, Davide Pagliarani met with Cardinal Víctor Manuel Fernández, the head of the Dicastery for the Doctrine of the Faith. The dicastery stated its openness to begin talks with SSPX, while warning against the planned consecrations.

On 18 February 2026, the FSSPX published a letter addressed by Don Pagliarani to Cardinal Fernandez, in which 1 July was confirmed as the starting point for the new episcopal consecrations.

On 13 May 2026 Cardinal Víctor Manuel Fernández, prefect of the Dicastery for the Doctrine of the Faith, explicitly warned the Society that the planned episcopal consecrations in July would be considered an act of formal schism, and result in the excommunication of the new bishops and all involved in the consecrations.

On 16 June 2026, Pope Leo XIV urged the Society not to proceed with the announced consecrations. On 30 June 2026, Pope Leo XIV addressed an open letter to the Superior General of the Fraternity in which he asked to renounce consecrations.

On 1 July 2026, Bishop Alfonso de Galarreta, proceeded with the consecrations to the episcopate of the four aforementioned priests of the SSPX, with Bernard Fellay acting as co-consecrator. This resulted in the automatic excommunication of the SSPX. The Holy See confirmed the excommunication of the entire society the following day, and the Dicastery for the Doctrine of the Faith rescinded the confession and marriage faculties previously granted to SSPX priests, on the grounds that schismatics lack the jurisdiction necessary for such sacraments to be valid. The 2017 provisions granted SSPX priests this faculty and delegation; the 2026 decree withdrew them. (Note: The decree of the excommunication, and the explanatory note.)

== Canonical situation ==
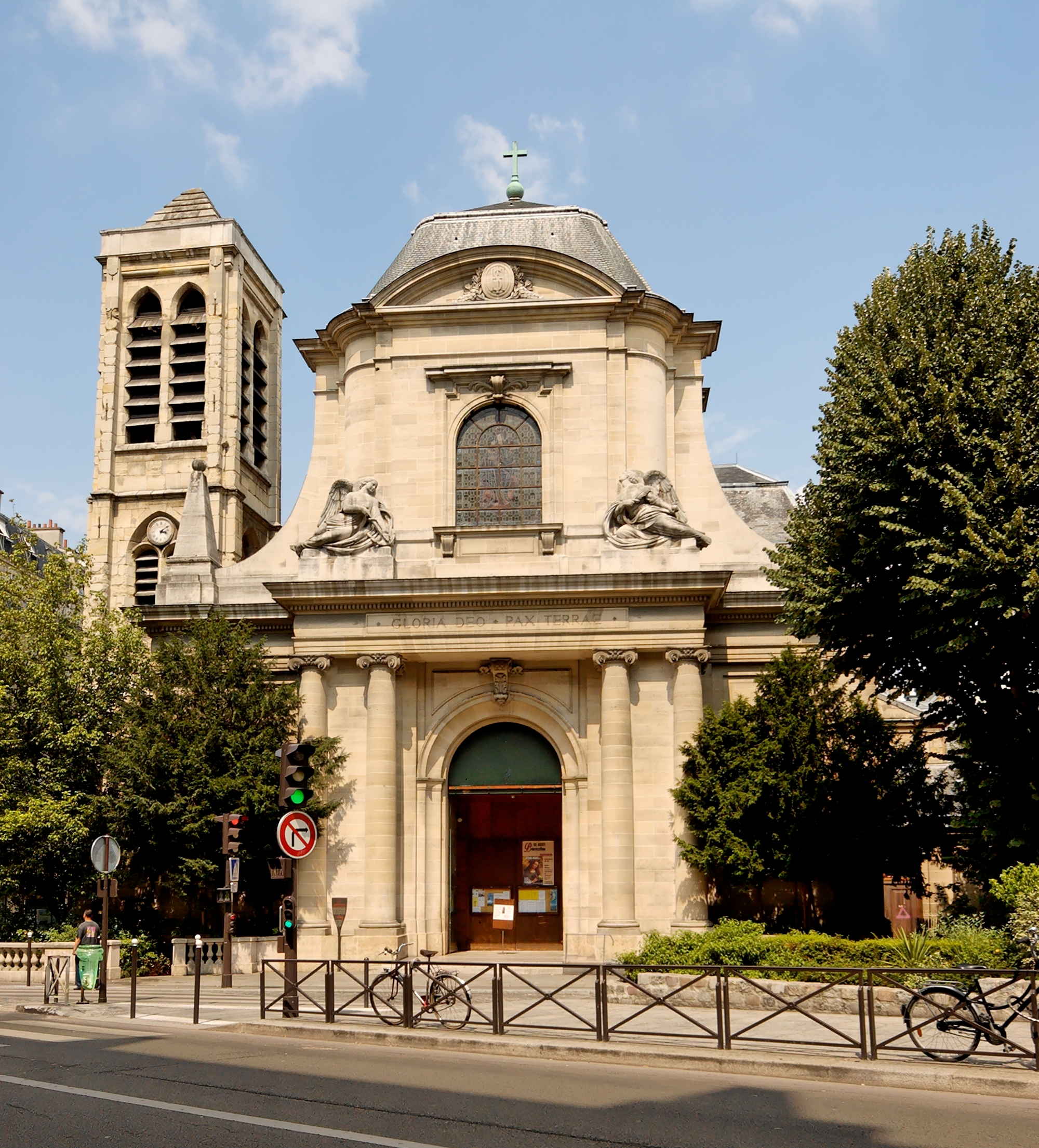
Saint-Nicolas-du-Chardonnet, Paris, occupied by SSPX since 1977

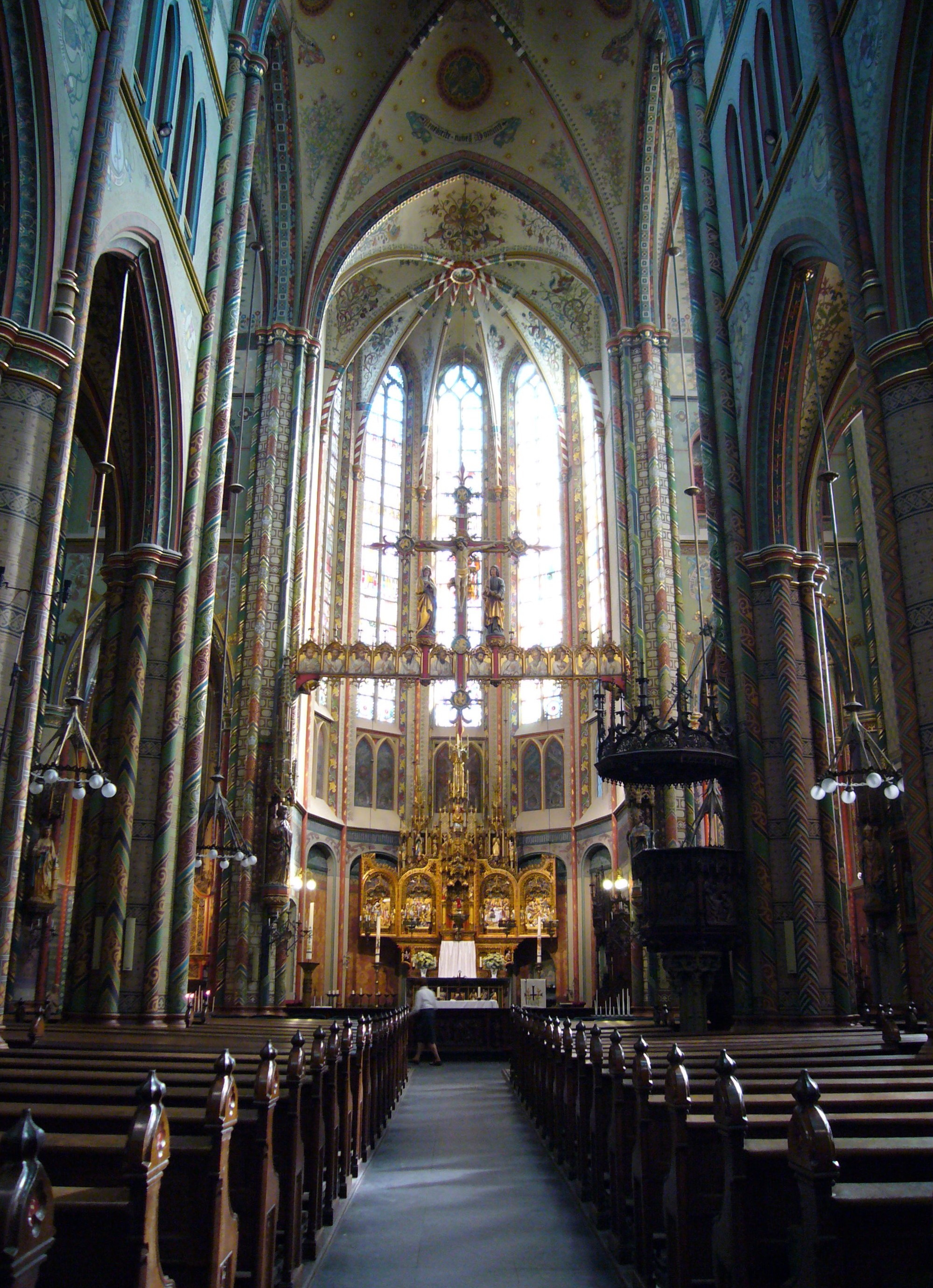
St. Willibrord's Church, Utrecht, Netherlands, operated by SSPX since 2015

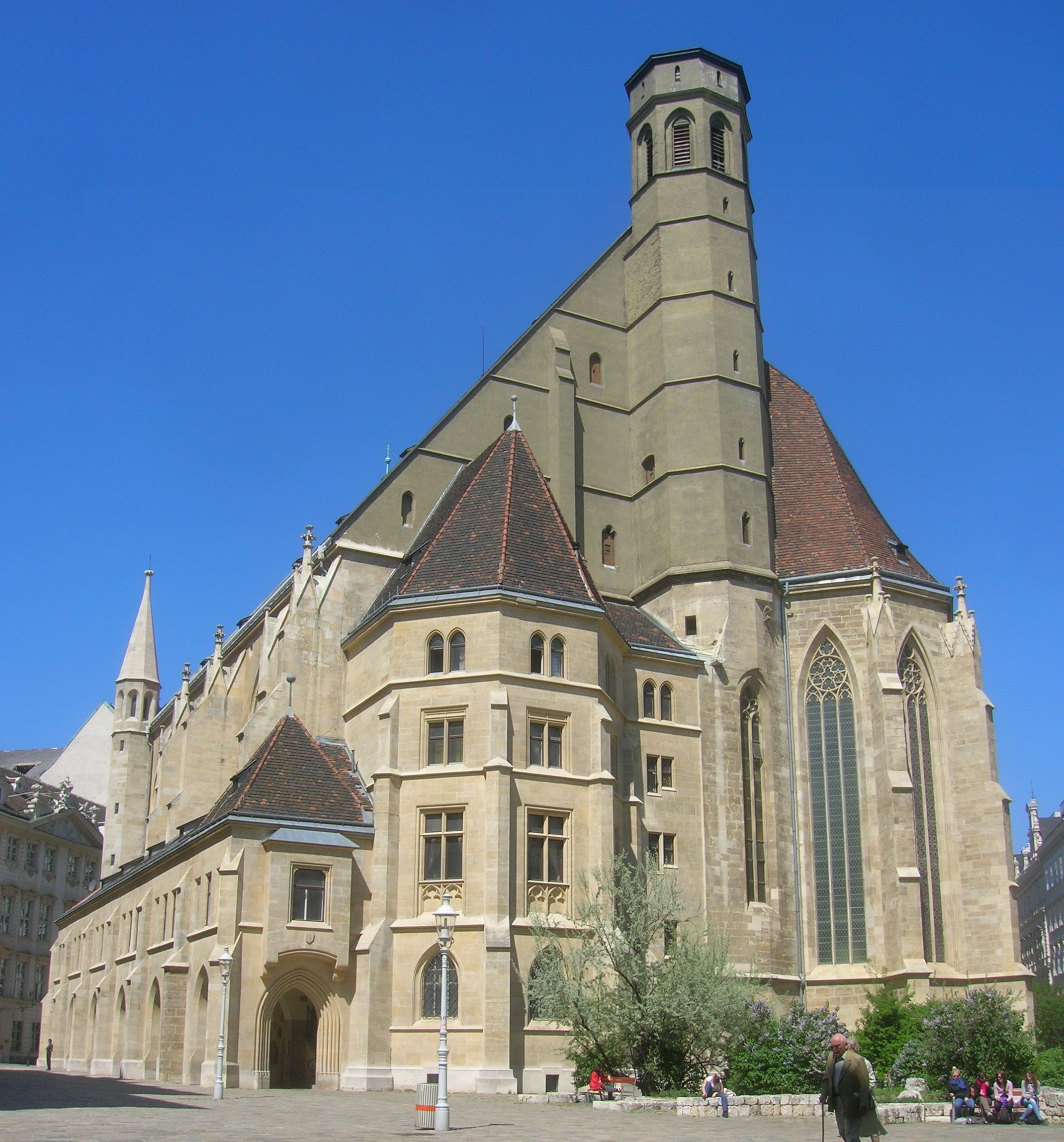
Minoritenkirche, Vienna, Austria, received by SSPX as a gift in 2021

SSPX was founded as a Pious Union in 1970, but was suppressed in 1975 by Bishop Pierre Mamie with the approval of the Roman Curia. In 1988, Pope John Paul II excommunicated Lefebvre and the four bishops consecrated by him, as well as "those who adhered to the schism". In 1996, the Pontifical Council for Legislative Texts declared that "the whole Lefebvrian movement was to be considered schismatic".

In 2009, Pope Benedict XVI remitted the excommunications of the four bishops consecrated by Lefebvre, but reiterated that SSPX had no canonical status.

In 2026, the whole fraternity was declared schismatic by the Dicastery for the Doctrine of the Faith, excommunicating all clergy associated with the society and forbidding them from licitly celebrating any sacraments.

=== Marriage ===
On 27 March 2017, the Congregation for the Doctrine of the Faith communicated that Pope Francis granted local ordinaries the right to give to a priest in good standing the faculty to preside at the marriage of the society's followers, immediately after which they will participate in a Mass celebrated by an SSPX priest, or, if no priest in good standing can receive the couple's consent, to give the faculty instead to an SSPX priest. This faculty was revoked by the Dicastery for the Doctrine of the Faith after the illicit consecrations of four bishops in 2026.

=== Confession ===
On 20 November 2016, Pope Francis personally and indefinitely extended an allowance he created during the Holy Year of 2015 for penitents confessing to priests affiliated with SSPX:

For the Jubilee Year I had also granted that those faithful who, for various reasons, attend churches officiated by the priests of the Priestly Fraternity of Saint Pius X, can validly and licitly receive the sacramental absolution of their sins.

As with the faculties to validly witness marriages, this was revoked by the Dicastery for the Doctrine of the Faith in July 2026.

=== Denying the validity of the suppression and the excommunications ===
The SSPX considers that its suppression as a canonical organization by the Catholic Church is null and void.

The SSPX also considers its 1988 and 2026 excommunications as null and void.

The SSPX considers itself not to be in schism with the Catholic Church.

== Organisational structure ==
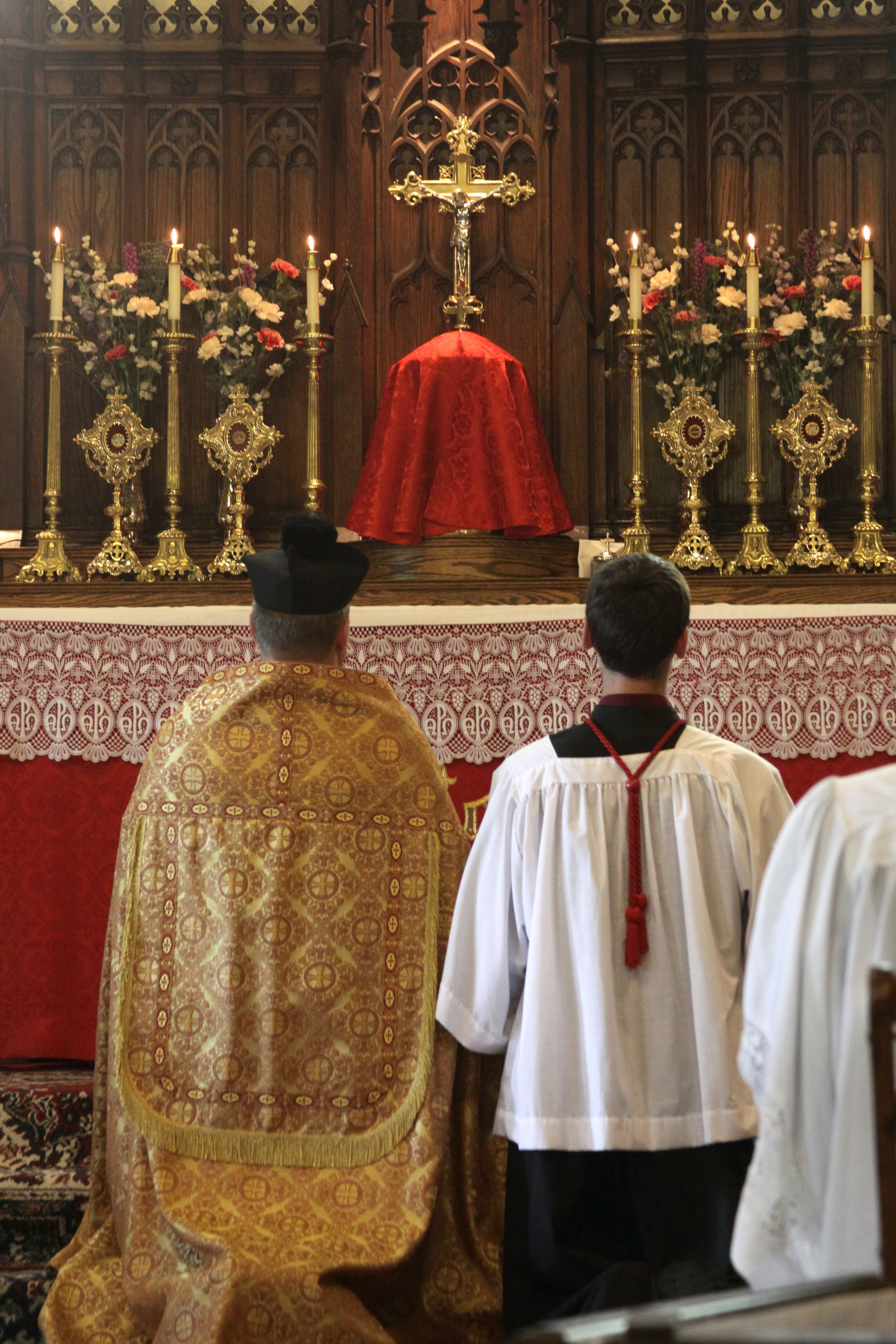
A liturgy held at the society's St. Jude's Chapel, Philadelphia, U.S.

As of January 2026, the society had 2 bishops and 733 priests residing in 77 countries, 760 Mass centers, 159 priories, 144 religious brothers, 88 sister oblates, 264 seminarians in five seminaries.

In 2025, the Congregation of the Sisters of the Society Saint Pius X numbered 245 professed sisters in 30 communities throughout 10 countries: France, Belgium, Switzerland, Germany, Italy, the United States, Argentina, Gabon, the Dominican Republic, and Australia.

The society is divided into two classes of territorial units called districts and autonomous houses, each headed by a superior. An autonomous house may become a district after three priories have been established within its jurisdiction. The most recent organizational addition of the society is the Autonomous House of Central America and the Caribbean, formed from territory taken from the District of Mexico, erected on 1 October 2017. Over 120 (>20%) of the society's priests are stationed in the District of France.

Facilities by District
District	Priories	Chapels	Retreat centers	Schools
Africa	8	32	–	5
Asia	6	54	1	2
Australia and New Zealand	8	40	–	5
Austria	4	35	–	–
Belgium and the Netherlands	3	12	–	1
Canada	7	44	1	4
Eastern Europe	7	27	1	3
France	46	187	3	62
Germany	11	52	1	5
Great Britain and Ireland	6	43	–	1
Italy	4	25	2	2
Mexico	6	41	3	1
South America	8	40	1	4
Switzerland	9	28	1	7
USA	22	129	4	32
Total	155	789	18	134

Facilities by autonomous house
Autonomous house	Priories	Chapels	Schools
Central America and Caribbean	3	25	2
Brazil	4	18	1
Spain and Portugal	2	17	–
Total	9	60	3

The first seminary founded by the society is the St. Pius X International Seminary located in Écône, Switzerland. Its largest is located in the United States: St. Thomas Aquinas Seminary, Dillwyn, Virginia, and having outgrown its previous facilities, relocated in 2016 from Winona, Minnesota; the former seminary complex continues to house the novitiate of the religious brothers.

Other seminaries are located in France (Saint Curé d'Ars Seminary, Flavigny-sur-Ozerain), Germany (Sacred Heart of Jesus Seminary, Zaitzkofen), and Argentina (Seminario Nuestra Señora Corredentora, La Reja). The society also runs pre-seminaries for prospective priestly vocations in Italy (Albano Laziale), Brazil (Santa Maria), and the Philippines (Santa Barbara, Iloilo).

=== Superiors general ===
Name	Nationality	Term
Abp Marcel Lefebvre	France	1970–1982
Fr Franz Schmidberger	Germany	1982–1994
Bp Bernard Fellay	Switzerland	1994–2018
Don Davide Pagliarani	Italy	2018–present

=== Laity ===
Properly speaking, no members of the laity belong to the SSPX. Indeed, as a priestly fraternity, its members are limited to priests, religious, and seminarians.

It is difficult to estimate how many laity attend Mass regularly at the SSPX chapels; the SSPX itself does not have worldwide attendance counts.

Cardinal Darío Castrillón Hoyos, at the time president of the Pontifical Commission Ecclesia Dei, estimated in 2007 that the number who attended SSPX chapels was around 600,000; this is the number that the SSPX cites, and which many news sources, such as the BBC, republish. However, The Guardian estimates closer to 150,000 to 200,000.

Catholic news publisher The Pillar reported that traditionalist blog Rorate Caeli estimated the number to be much lower, around 100,000. It arrived at this number by taking the SSPX's published attendance of 25,000 in its District of the USA, its largest district, comparing it to the similarly-sized District of France, and estimating the remaining districts to number only several tens of thousands. French Catholic magazine La Nef estimated the attendance in the French district to be 35,000 in 2021. Using that number and erring on the side of generosity to assume 20,000 for each of the other thirteen districts, The Pillar estimated that the total worldwide attendance of SSPX could not exceed 320,000.

== Splits from the SSPX ==
The group has a long history of numerous splits and defections. There have been two major kinds of splits from the SSPX. Two notable splits of the first kind involved priests who viewed SSPX as too liberal and who use the form that the Mass had before Pope John XXIII. The other kind involved groups who have reconciled with the Holy See and who, like SSPX, use the 1962 edition of the Roman Missal.

Groups which broke with the SSPX which are not recognized by the Holy See include:

- Society of Saint Pius V: in 1983, nine U.S. SSPX priests broke with or were forced to leave SSPX's Northeast USA District partly because they were opposed to Lefebvre's instructions that Mass be celebrated according to the 1962 edition of the Roman Missal issued by Pope John XXIII.
- Istituto Mater Boni Consilii (English: "Institute of the Mother of Good Counsel"), a traditionalist congregation of priests that follows the sedeprivationist school of thought. The founders of the institute seceded in 1985 from the Society of St. Pius X under the leadership of Fr. Francesco Ricossa, a one-time faculty member of the Écône seminary. In contrast to the North American-based SSPV, this Institute is based in Europe.
- SSPX Resistance and Priestly Union Marcel Lefebvre: a traditionalist Catholic apostolic association founded on 15 July 2014 by Bishop Richard Williamson after his expulsion from the Priestly Fraternity of Saint Pius X.
- Sons of the Most Holy Redeemer (Filii Sanctissimi Redemptoris, FSSR): founded as a religious community affiliated with SSPX in 1988. In 2008 the community petitioned to be reconciled with the Holy See, which was accepted by then Pope Benedict XVI. The Bishop of Christchurch on 13 July 2024 disallowed priests of the Sons of the Most Holy Redeemer to minister in the Diocese of Christchurch. In May 2026, the religious community published a document, signed by all its members, in which they rejected the Second Vatican Council and declared the Sedevancantist belief.

Groups which broke with the SSPX but reconciled with Rome include:

- Priestly Fraternity of Saint Peter (FSSP): established in 1988 after the Écône consecrations. Responding to the Holy See's declaration that these constituted a schismatic act and that those involved were thereby automatically excommunicated, twelve priests left SSPX and established the FSSP, in full communion with the Holy See.
- Institute of the Good Shepherd (Institut du Bon-Pasteur, IBP), established as a papally-recognized society of apostolic life on 8 September 2006 for a group of the SSPX members who maintained it was time for the society to accept reconciliation with Pope Benedict XVI.

== Lifestyle and dress code ==
In the Society of Saint Pius X, a complementarian position for gender roles is upheld; "In St. Mary's, few married women work, especially once they have children."

Richard Williamson, a now deceased former bishop of the SSPX who later went on to align with the SSPX Resistance, wrote a pastoral letter, in which he stated that "women's trousers, as worn today, short or long, modest or immodest, tight or loose, open or disguised (like the 'culottes'), are an assault upon woman's womanhood and so they represent a deep-lying revolt against the order willed by God." The Atlantic, in covering SSPX, described their female adherents as "women in long, modest skirts loading vans that had enough seats to accommodate eight or nine kids."

During Catholic Mass, though there is no strict dress code, the SSPX advises "Sunday best" attire. Women are recommended to wear skirts that fall at least below the knee, and no tight-fitting clothing. It is customary for women to wear a veil during prayer and worship. Men are encouraged to wear suits and ties.

== Publications ==
According to the will of Mgr. Lefebvre, since its foundation in 1978, the publishing house Angelus Press is the "official publisher and editor of books, brochures and all other official publications of the Society originating from the Society's international headquarters in Switzerland".

Edizioni Piane is the FSSPX's official publishing house in its Italian district.

Each district has its own official magazine: The Angelus (US district), Tradizione cattolica (Italian district), and Courrier de Rome (French district).

== Controversies ==
=== Political ===
After Bishop Richard Williamson, the subject of the complaint by the Anti-Defamation League, denied the use of Nazi gas chambers to massacre Jews in a 2009 interview, the superior-general of the society said that if he repeated his denial, he would be expelled. His expulsion in 2012 was for refusing to show due respect and obedience to the SSPX authorities and calling on the superior-general to resign. A German court convicted Williamson of Holocaust denial.

French Nazi collaborator and war criminal Paul Touvier was arrested in an SSPX priory. The priory's superiors claimed that they had granted him asylum as "an act of charity to a homeless man". They claimed no knowledge about the man's background when he first appeared in the priory. On his death, in 1996, an SSPX Requiem Mass was offered for his soul, upon his request.

On 16 October 2013, the society offered to perform a funeral for Nazi war criminal Erich Priebke. Priebke, a baptized Protestant, converted post-war with his wife to a form of Catholicism and had his children baptized. He rejected the cult of race as a "mistake that led down a path of no return." The ceremony did not take place due to protests by some 500 people outside the society's Italian district house in Albano, near Rome. The local authorities of the Catholic Church refused him a public funeral, citing a rule of canon law that, unless they gave some signs of repentance before death, a public funeral must be refused to manifest sinners to whom it cannot be granted without public scandal of the faithful.

Textbooks in schools run by the SSPX were reported to glorify Philippe Pétain, the leader of Nazi-allied Vichy France, and did not mention the The Holocaust.

Despite controversies surrounding Nazism, the society mentioned that Archbishop Lefebvre's father, René Lefebvre, met his death in the concentration camp at Sonnenburg in February 1944, three years after his arrest by the Gestapo; he died, "his rosary in hand, a victim of Nazi insanity."

The SSPX is also known for supporting the far-right, nationalist, ultra-conservative political party Civitas in France (dissolved in 2023). In 2025, a priest attempted to celebrate a Mass in honor of Spanish dictator Francisco Franco and José Antonio Primo de Rivera, the founder of the fascist Falange Española movement.

=== Sexual abuse allegations ===
On 5 April 2017, Uppdrag granskning, a Swedish television program, alleged that four members of SSPX (three priests and a former seminarian) had molested at least a dozen young people in several countries. The program also stated that evidence of abuse was kept secret by SSPX and that the priests were allowed to continue in ministry.

Kevin Gerard Sloniker, the former seminarian and the only person accused by name in the program, was expelled from the society's St. Thomas Aquinas Seminary in 2005. In 2016, Sloniker pled guilty for molesting seven boys with ages ranging from 8 to 14 over a period of about 10 years. He was sentenced to life imprisonment with the possibility of parole after 35 years. The remaining three accusations regard priests whose names have been withheld (referred to in the program as Fathers P, S, and M); their accusers have likewise remained anonymous. Nonetheless, P was the subject of a canonical trial presided over by Bishop Fellay, authorized by the Congregation for the Doctrine of the Faith in 2013; he was found guilty, and subsequently ordered to retire to a monastery. Crux reports that "P refused to go and, according to officials of SSPX, joined [Bishop] Williamson's Resistance."

In May 2020, the Kansas Bureau of Investigation stated that, as part of its investigation into the four Catholic dioceses in the state, it was also investigating accusations that SSPX members were either perpetrating or covering up clerical sex abuse in the state. SSPX St. Mary's Rectory in Kansas faced sex abuse allegations, although both the U.S. district of the society and the St. Mary's Rectory denied the allegations.

== See also ==
- Church of the Mission of France
- SSPX-affiliated religious orders
- Institute of consecrated life
- Minaret controversy in Switzerland
- Priestly Society of Saint Josaphat, a related group in the Ukrainian Greek Catholic Church
- St. Mary's College, Kansas
- St. Dominic's College, Wanganui
- The International Seminary of Saint Pius X

== Sources ==
=== Books ===
==== Apologia Pro Marcel Lefebvre ====
- Davies, Michael (1979b). "Chapter 4: The Campaign Against Écône". Apologia Pro Marcel Lefebvre. Vol. 1. Angelus Press.

==== Others ====
- Schreiber, Jean-Philippe (15 November 2019). Les formes contemporaines de l'antimaçonnisme: Sciences des religions (in French). Editions de l'Université de Bruxelles. ISBN 978-2-8004-1706-6.
- Priebke, Erich; Giachini, Paolo (2003). Autobiografia: Vae victis [Autobiography: Woe to the defeated] (in Italian). Rome: Associazione Uomo e Libertà. ISBN 9788890100901.

=== SSPX ===
==== Angelus Press ====
- du Chalard, Emmanuel (June 1993). "The Heirs of Archbishop Lefebvre and the Council". SiSiNoNo. 2. Translated by Angelus Press. Archived from the original on 23 June 2002.
- Knittel, François (April 2004). "Pascendi exposes Modernist tactics". The Angelus. Translated for Angelus Press by Fr. Jaime Pazat de Lys. Archived from the original on 5 December 2013 – via sspx.org.

==== archives.sspx.org ====
- archives (2013). "Question 11: Wasn't Archbishop Lefebvre excommunicated for consecrating bishops unlawfully?". archives.sspx.org. Archived from the original on 17 August 2013.
- de Mallerais, Bernard Tissier (9–10 March 1991). "Supplied Jurisdiction & Traditional Priests". archives.sspx.org. Archived from the original on 14 June 2020.
- Lefebvre, Marcel (21 November 1974). "The 1974 Declaration of Archbishop Lefebvre". archives.sspx.org. Archived from the original on 16 April 2015.

==== District of the USA ====
- Angles, Ramon (2014). "Validity of SSPX's confessions & marriages". SSPX – District of the USA.
- de Castro Mayer, Antônio (30 June 1988). "Bishop de Castro Mayer's 1988 declaration at Econe". SSPX – District of the USA.
- "Do priests of the SSPX have jurisdiction?". SSPX – District of the USA. 2 July 2015.
- "Interview with Bp. Bernard Fellay". SSPX – District of the USA. 4 March 2016. Archived from the original on 26 March 2016.
- "SSPX Marriages are Incontestable". SSPX – District of the USA. 11 April 2017.
- "A Story of Providence: Born in a Time of Confusion for Holy Mother Church". SSPX – District of the USA. November 2018. Archived from the original on 8 November 2018.
- "Joint communiqué of Bishop Huonder and Father Pagliarani". SSPX – District of the USA. 20 May 2019.
- "The Society of Saint Pius X Reaches Milestone of 700 Priestly Members". SSPX – District of the USA. 7 July 2022. Archived from the original on 20 September 2022.
- "We look forward to seeing you at Mass!". SSPX – District of the USA. 2023. Archived from the original on 5 January 2023.

==== General House ====
- "Autonomous Houses". SSPX – General House. 2023c. Archived from the original on 23 November 2023.
- "Seminaries". SSPX – General House. 2023a. Archived from the original on 23 November 2023.
- "Districts". SSPX – General House. 2023b.
- "Priestly Ordination, Novice of the Fathers of the Holy Ghost and Missionary Activity". SSPX – General House. 2024. Archived from the original on 14 January 2024.

==== FSSPX News ====
- "Society of Saint Pius X: Ordinations 2020–2021". FSSPX News. 2 August 2021.
- "Bishop Schneider Comes to the SSPX's Defense Again". FSSPX News. 7 November 2022.
- "SSPX Statistics 2025 | District of the USA". FSSPX News. 4 January 2026.

==== Others ====
- "Chi siamo". Edizioni Piane (in Italian). 2024.
- "Short History of the Society of Saint Pius X". Holy Cross Seminary. 2003. Archived from the original on 24 September 2015.
- "Fr. Schmidberger: 40 years of priesthood". Immaculate Conception Church. 4 December 2015. Archived from the original on 31 July 2023.
- "Statistiques de la FSSPX". La Porte Latine (in French). 20 March 2021.
- "Archbishop Lefebvre and the Society of St. Pius X". FSSPX – District of Great Britain. 2026.
- Williamson, Richard (1 September 1991). "Bishop Williamson's Letters". Archived from the original on 18 May 2002.

=== Code of Canon Law ===
- "Cann. 747 – 755". Book III – The Teaching Function of the Church. Codex Iuris Canonici. 1983a.
- "Part I. Title III. Those who are liable to Penal Sanctions (Cann. 1321 – 1330)". Book VI – Penal Sanctions in the Church. Codex Iuris Canonici. 1983b.
- "Part II. Title III. Offences against the Sacraments (Cann. 1379 – 1389)". Book VI – Penal Sanctions in the Church. Codex Iuris Canonici. 1983c.

=== Websites ===
==== Vatican ====
- Pope Pius XII (29 June 1958). "Ad Apostolorum Principis". vatican.va.
- Pope John Paul II (2 July 1988). "Apostolic Letter "Ecclesia Dei"". vatican.va.
- Pope Francis (1 September 2015). "Letter". iubilaeummisericordiae.va.
- Pope Francis (20 November 2016). "Apostolic Letter "Misericordia et misera"". vatican.va.
- Card. Müller, Gerhard Ludwig (4 April 2017). "Letter of the Pontifical Commission "Ecclesia Dei" to the Ordinaries of the Episcopal Conferences concerned on the faculties for the celebration of marriages of the faithful of the Society Saint Pius X". press.vatican.va.
- Wells, Christopher (4 April 2017). "New pastoral provisions for Sacrament of Marriage for SSPX". Vatican Radio.

==== Others ====
- DeClue, Richard G. (26 March 2026). "The history and controversies of the SSPX". WordOnFire.org. Washington, DC: Word on Fire Catholic Ministries.
- "Marcel Lefebvre". Encyclopædia Britannica. 2026.

=== News articles ===
- Associated Press (16 January 2013). "German Court Convicts British Holocaust-denying Bishop". Haaretz.
- Associated Press (23 September 2017). "Conservative Theologians Accuse Pope of Spreading Heresy". The New York Times. Archived from the original on 25 September 2017.
- Barber, Tony (3 February 2009). "Bishop Williamson takes aim at women's trousers and 'The Sound of Music'". Financial Times.
- Bunderson, Carl (14 December 2012). "Government announces probe into SSPX associate group". Union of Catholic Asian News.
- Card. Gantin, Bernardin (1 July 1988). "Decree of Excomunication of Archbishop Lefebvre" – via EWTN.
- Galindo, Gabriela (15 June 2020). "Paedophile priest found free in Switzerland after conviction in Belgium". The Brussels Times.
- Gagnon, Luc (18 September 2003). "The Wanderer Interviews Fr. Aulagnier, SSPX". The Wanderer.
- Ariza, Gabriel (10 April 2017). "Burke: 'There is a very dangerous confusion and also with the confusion come divisions'". InfoVaticana.
- Kramer, Becky (28 October 2016). "Trucker who molested boys from his church will spend at least 35 years in prison". The Spokesman-Review.
- La Croix (17 February 2018). "Un abbé intégriste condamné à 19 ans de réclusion en appel pour viols". La Croix (in French).
- "VIOLS Un prêtre intégriste poursuivi pour agressions sexuelles". La Dernière Heure (in French). 18 March 2005.
- Martiniere, Mathieu; Périsse, Mathieu; Gastaldi, Daphné; Fegan, Ali (5 April 2017). "The hidden sex abuse cases at a Franco-Swiss Catholic priest fraternity". Mediapart.
- Pongratz-Lippitt, Christa (15 September 2021). "Historic Viennese church given to Lefebvrists". The Tablet.
- Ridley, Charles (16 June 1988). "Vatican threatens dissident priest with excommunication". United Press International.
- San Martín, Inés (5 April 2017). "Report charges cover-up of sexual abuse by traditionalist society". Crux. Archived from the original on 6 April 2017.
- Thomas, Judy L. (17 May 2020). "KBI is investigating priests in Kansas town that draws parishioners from across U.S." The Kansas City Star.

==== The Atlantic ====
- Douthat, Ross (26 January 2009). "The Church and the Lefebvrists". The Atlantic.
- Green, Emma (January 2020). "The Christian Withdrawal Experiment". The Atlantic.

==== Catholic Culture ====
- "Bishop Fellay to expel Bishop Williamson from SSPX if he denies Holocaust again". Catholic Culture. 3 March 2009.
- "Bishop Williamson ousted from SSPX". Catholic Culture. 24 October 2012.
- "Vatican names Bishop Fellay to hear canonical charge against SSPX priest, despite bishop's suspension". Catholic Culture. 4 June 2015.
- "Vatican official confirms: agreement with SSPX is close". Catholic Culture. 20 March 2017a.
- "SSPX accused of abuse cover-up". Catholic Culture. 5 April 2017b.
- "SSPX bishops authorized to ordain priests without permission of local bishops". Catholic Culture. 24 May 2017c.

==== Catholic News Agency ====
- "Pope extends Jubilee mandate on abortion, SSPX confession". Catholic News Agency. 21 November 2016.
- Hadro, Matt (20 May 2020). "Kansas investigating sexual abuse claims in breakaway Society of St. Pius X". Catholic News Agency.

==== National Catholic Reporter ====
- Fox, Thomas C. (26 January 2009). "Lefebvre movement: long, troubled history with Judaism". National Catholic Reporter.
- Wooden, Cindy (16 October 2013). "Nazi war criminal's SSPX funeral stopped by protests". National Catholic Reporter. Archived from the original on 17 October 2015.
- Esteves, Junno Arocho (4 April 2017). "Pope approves provisions to recognize marriages of SSPX faithful". National Catholic Reporter.

==== Swedish News ====
- Fegan, Ali; Svensson, Lars-Göran; Andersson, Ida (6 April 2017a). "Pope helped SSPX after scandal with Holocaust-denying bishop". SVT Uppdrag granskning.
- Fegan, Ali; Svensson, Lars-Göran; Andersson, Ida (6 April 2017b). "New cover-ups of assaults by Catholic priests". SVT Uppdrag granskning.

==== Swiss News ====
- "Swiss priest convicted of sexual abuse at Belgian school". swissinfo. 14 December 2017.
- Zbinden, Raphaël (13 December 2017). "Pédophilie: un prêtre valaisan de la FSSPX condamné en Belgique". Portail catholique suisse (in French).
