= São Fidélis =

- Municipality
- The Municipality of São Fidélis
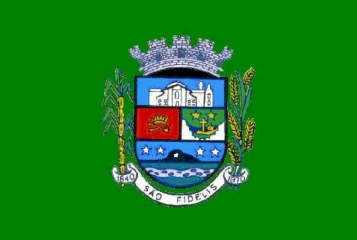
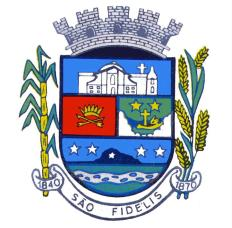
- Flag Coat of arms
- Motto: Cidade Poema
- Location of São Fidélis

- Location within Brazil
- Coordinates: 21°38′45″S 41°44′49″W
- Country: Brazil
- Region: Southeast
- State: Rio de Janeiro

Population (2020)
  - Total: 38,710
- Time zone: UTC−3 (BRT)

São Fidélis (Portuguese pronunciation: [ˈsɐ̃w fiˈdɛliʃ]) is a municipality located in the Brazilian state of Rio de Janeiro. Its population was 38,710 (2020) and its area is 1,028 km^{2}.

The municipality contains part of the 21,444-hectare (52,990-acre) Desengano State Park, created in 1970.

== Climate ==
Climate data for São Fidélis (1981–2010)
Month	Jan	Feb	Mar	Apr	May	Jun	Jul	Aug	Sep	Oct	Nov	Dec	Year
Mean daily maximum °C (°F)	33.5 (92.3)	34.6 (94.3)	33.6 (92.5)	32.1 (89.8)	29.9 (85.8)	28.8 (83.8)	28.3 (82.9)	29.3 (84.7)	29.3 (84.7)	30.5 (86.9)	31.3 (88.3)	32.2 (90.0)	31.1 (88.0)
Mean daily minimum °C (°F)	22.2 (72.0)	22.3 (72.1)	21.8 (71.2)	20.3 (68.5)	17.9 (64.2)	16.0 (60.8)	15.6 (60.1)	16.4 (61.5)	18.1 (64.6)	19.7 (67.5)	20.9 (69.6)	21.6 (70.9)	19.4 (66.9)
Average precipitation mm (inches)	222.0 (8.74)	143.0 (5.63)	191.0 (7.52)	104.0 (4.09)	67.0 (2.64)	32.0 (1.26)	29.0 (1.14)	33.0 (1.30)	76.0 (2.99)	124.0 (4.88)	241.0 (9.49)	283.0 (11.14)	1,545 (60.82)
Source 1: Instituto Nacional de Meteorologia
Source 2: Climatempo (precipitation)
