= International Seminary of Saint Pius X =

Lefebvrist seminary in Switzerland

Coordinates: 46.1562435°N 7.2042985°E

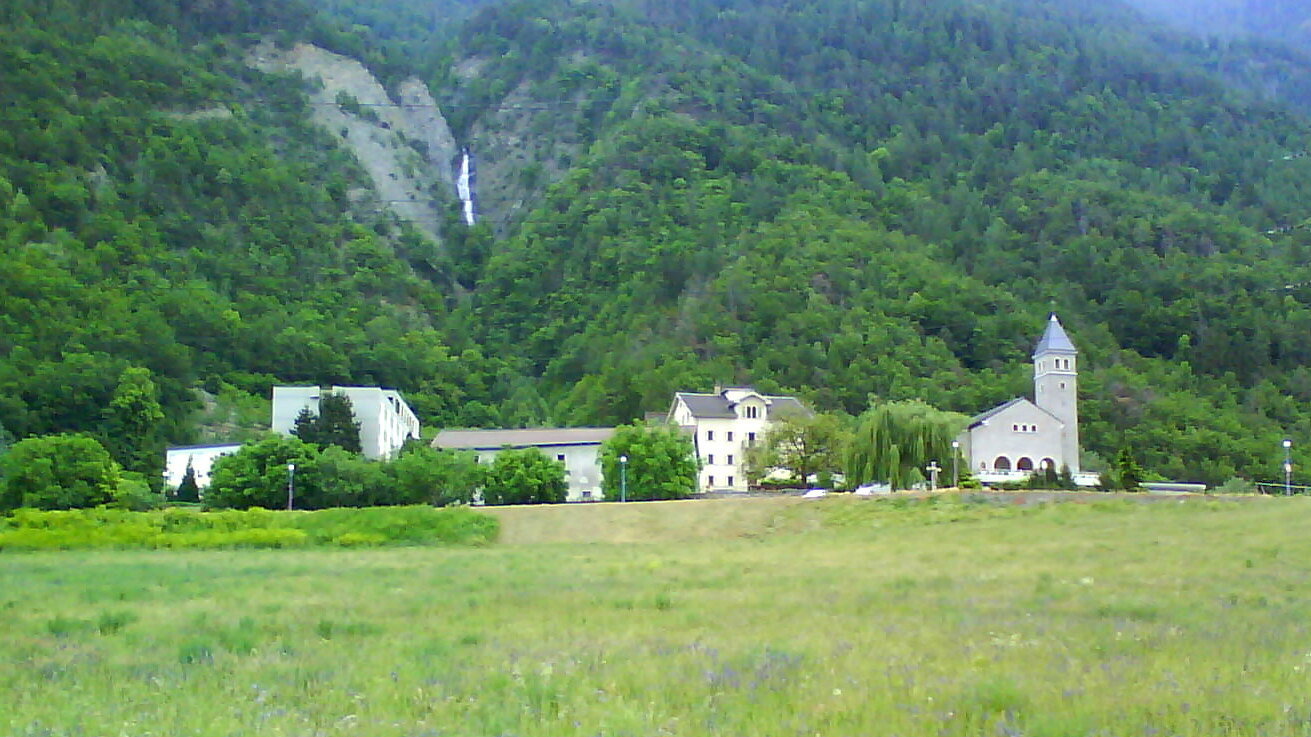
The International Seminary of Saint Pius X in Écône.

The International Seminary of Saint Pius X in Écône, Valais, Switzerland, is the premier seminary of the Society of Saint Pius X (SSPX). The seminary is one of the six houses for formation for the future priests of the Society of Saint Pius X. The Seminary was founded in 1970 by Archbishop Marcel Lefebvre, and his tomb can be found there.

== History ==
SSPX was founded, with the canonical approval of the Bishop of Fribourg, in 1970 by French Archbishop Marcel Lefebvre, former Superior General of the Holy Ghost Fathers (1962–1968), a Father of the Second Vatican Council and one of the best-known prelates in Africa, where he spent much of his early pastoral ministry. He retired as head of the Holy Ghost Fathers in 1968 when the order began revisions of its constitutions, which Lefebvre considered modernist.

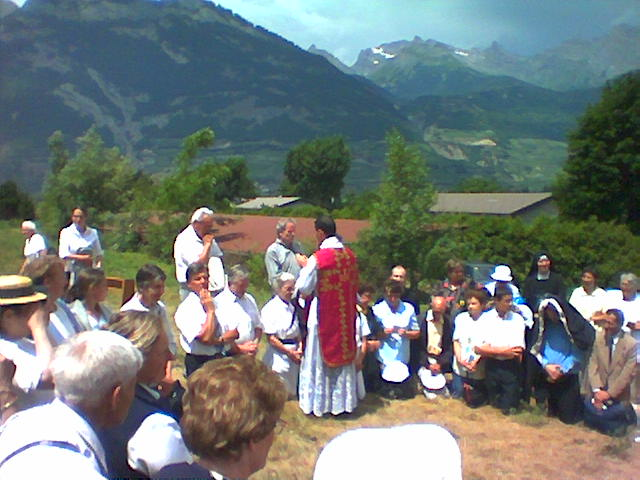
A priest giving blessings after ordination at the SSPX seminary at Écône

Shortly after his resignation, Archbishop Lefebvre was approached by seminarians from the French Seminary in Rome who, he said, were being persecuted for their adherence to traditional beliefs and doctrines. They sought advice on a conservative seminary to complete their studies. He directed them to the University of Fribourg, Switzerland.

In 1970, urged by the Abbot of Hauterive and the Dominican theologian and priest, Fr. Marie-Dominique Philippe, to teach these seminarians personally, Lefebvre approached the Bishop of Fribourg, who, three months before resigning his see, approved, with a document predated by six days to 1 November 1970, the founding of SSPX at the level of a pia unio, the preliminary stage towards becoming an officially recognized religious institute or Society of Apostolic Life. Affluent Swiss laymen offered the seminary at Écône in Switzerland to the newly formed group.

The seminary received a reputation as a "wildcat seminary" for its teaching of traditional catholic practices which were being abandoned in most other parts of the church. The statements made by two apostolic visitors to the seminary in November 1974 resulted in Lefebvre's "Declaration" as a rebuttal. At the seminary, in 1988, he consecrated four bishops without papal approval, an act by which he incurred excommunication latae sententiae. Lefebvre resided in a private apartment on the property until his death in 1991 and is buried in a tomb nearby, which was visited by Cardinal Silvio Oddi in 1992.

Following the 2026 Écône consecrations at the International Seminary on 1 July, the next day, 2 July, the Apostolic See decreed all SSPX clergy automatically excommunicated for schism. (Note: Under canon 1364 §1, schism incurs automatic excommunication. For lay faithful, this applies only to those who "formally adhere" to the SSPX, per a 1996 test with two elements: an internal one, freely choosing loyalty to the Lefebvrist movement over obedience to the Pope, and an external one, shown by exclusively attending SSPX liturgies rather than those of the Catholic Church. Occasional attendance alone does not meet this standard. All SSPX clergy are considered to satisfy both elements automatically through their ministry within the movement.)
