= Diocese of Campos =

Catholic ecclesiastical territory

Coordinates: 21.7569°S 41.3239°W

Diocese of Campos Dioecesis Camposina

Catholic
- Catedral Basílica do Santíssimo Salvador

Location
- Country: Brazil
- Ecclesiastical province: Niterói

Statistics
- Area: 12,520 km^{2} (4,830 sq mi)
- Population: Total; Catholics: (as of 2004); 986,000; 854,000 (86.6%)

Information
- Rite: Latin Rite
- Established: 4 December 1922 (103 years ago)
- Cathedral: Catedral Basílica do Santíssimo Salvador

Current leadership
- Pope: Leo XIV
- Bishop: Roberto Francisco Ferrería Paz
- Metropolitan Archbishop: José Rezende Francisco Dias

Website
- http://diocesedecampos.org.br/

The Roman Catholic Diocese of Campos (Latin: Dioecesis Camposina) is a diocese located in the city of Campos dos Goytacazes in the ecclesiastical province of Niterói in Brazil.

== History ==
On December 4, 1922 it was established as the Diocese of Campos from the Diocese of Niterói.

== Bishops ==
The Bishops of Campos (Roman rite) are, in reverse chronological order:

- Bishop Roberto Francisco Ferrería Paz (2011.06.08 – present)
- Bishop Roberto Gomes Guimarães (1995.11.22 – 2011.06.08, retired)
- Bishop João Corso, S.D.B. (1990.10.12 – 1995.11.22, resigned)
- Bishop Carlos Alberto Etchandy Gimeno Navarro (1981.08.29 – 1990.05.09), appointed Archbishop of Niterói, Rio de Janeiro
- Bishop Antônio de Castro Mayer (1949.01.03 – 1981.08.29)
- Archbishop (personal title) Octaviano Pereira de Albuquerque (1935.12.16 – 1949.01.03)
- Bishop Henrique César Fernandes Mourão, S.D.B. (1925.05.01 – 1935.12.16), appointed Bishop of Cafelândia

=== Coadjutor bishop ===
- Antônio de Castro Mayer (1948-1949)

=== Other priests of this diocese who became bishops ===
- Fernando Arêas Rifan, appointed Coadjutor Apostolic Administrator of São João Maria Vianney, Rio de Janeiro in 2002
- Luiz Henrique da Silva Brito, appointed Auxiliary Bishop of São Sebastião do Rio de Janeiro in 2012
