= Antônio de Castro Mayer =

Brazilian Catholic clergyman

- Bishop of Campos
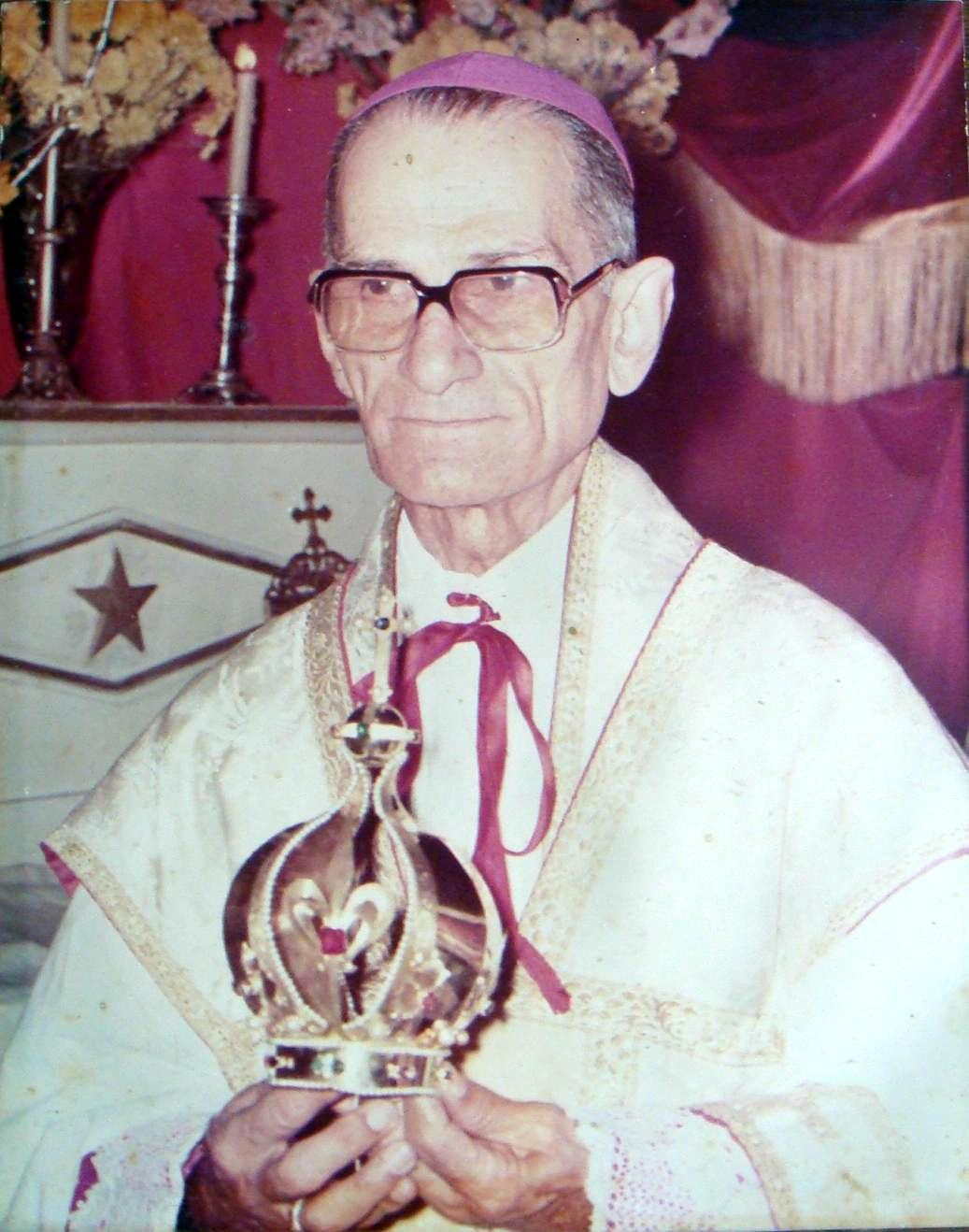
- Dom Antônio de Castro Mayer, in 1980.
- Diocese: Campos
- Term ended: 29 August 1981
- Predecessor: Octaviano Pereira de Albuquerque
- Successor: Carlos Alberto Etchandy Gimeno Navarro
- Previous posts: Coadjutor Bishop of Campos and Titular Bishop of Priene

Orders
- Ordination: 30 October 1927 by Basilio Pompili
- Consecration: 23 May 1948 by Carlo Chiarlo

Personal details
- Born: 20 June 1904 Campinas, São Paulo, Brazil
- Died: 25 April 1991 (aged 86) Campos dos Goytacazes, Rio de Janeiro, Brazil
- Denomination: Roman Catholic
- Coat of arms: Antônio de Castro Mayer's coat of arms

Styles of Antônio de Castro Mayer
- Reference style: His Excellency; The Most Reverend
- Spoken style: Your Excellency
- Religious style: Bishop

Ordination history of Antônio de Castro Mayer
History
Priestly ordination
- Ordained by: Basilio Cardinal Pompili
- Date: 30 October 1927
Episcopal consecration
- Consecrated by: Carlo Cardinal Chiarlo
- Date: 23 May 1948

Antônio de Castro Mayer (20 June 1904 – 25 April 1991) was a Brazilian Catholic prelate who served as Bishop of Campos from 1949 to 1981. A traditionalist Catholic and ally of Archbishop Marcel Lefebvre, he incurred automatic excommunication for participating in the 1988 illicit consecration of four bishops of the Society of St. Pius X.

== Early life ==
Antônio de Castro Mayer was born in Campinas, São Paulo, to João Mayer, a Bavarian stonemason.

He became Assistant General of the São Paulo's Catholic Action in 1940 and a canon of the cathedral chapter with the title of First Treasurer in 1941. He became vicar general of the archdiocese in 1942. He was made a parish priest and the prefect of studies at the Pontifical Catholic University of São Paulo in 1945, while retaining the chairs of Religion and Catholic Social Doctrine at the Pontifical Catholic University of São Paulo.

== Bishop ==
On 6 March 1948, Castro was appointed Coadjutor Bishop of Campos and titular bishop of Priene by Pope Pius XII. He received his episcopal consecration on 23 May from Archbishop Carlo Chiarlo, Apostolic Nuncio to Brazil, with Bishop Ernesto de Paula and Archbishop Geraldo de Proença Sigaud, S.V.D., as co-consecrators. He became bishop of Campos upon the death of Bishop Octaviano de Albuquerque on 3 January 1949.

In 1956, Castro opened the Minor Seminary of the Diocese in the village, now the city, of São Sebastião de Varre-Sai. In 1967, Dom Antônio obtained permission to operate the Major Seminary, with Philosophy and Theology courses (later transferred to Campos).

In 1968, the Catholic conservative group Tradition, Family and Property organized a campaign to collect signatures denouncing what were perceived as leftists in the Church. Castro Mayer lent encouragement to the campaign. The Episcopal Conference of Brazil later declared that TFP was neither recognized by the hierarchy nor considered an official Catholic organization.

Having submitted his resignation as required upon turning 75, he was replaced as bishop with the appointment of Carlos Alberto Etchandy Gimeno Navarro to succeed him on 29 August 1981.

With Archbishop Marcel Lefebvre, on 30 June 1988 Castro co-consecrated four bishops without papal authorization and incurred automatic excommunication.

He died of respiratory failure in Campos on 25 April 1991.
