= List of communities celebrating the Traditional Latin Mass =

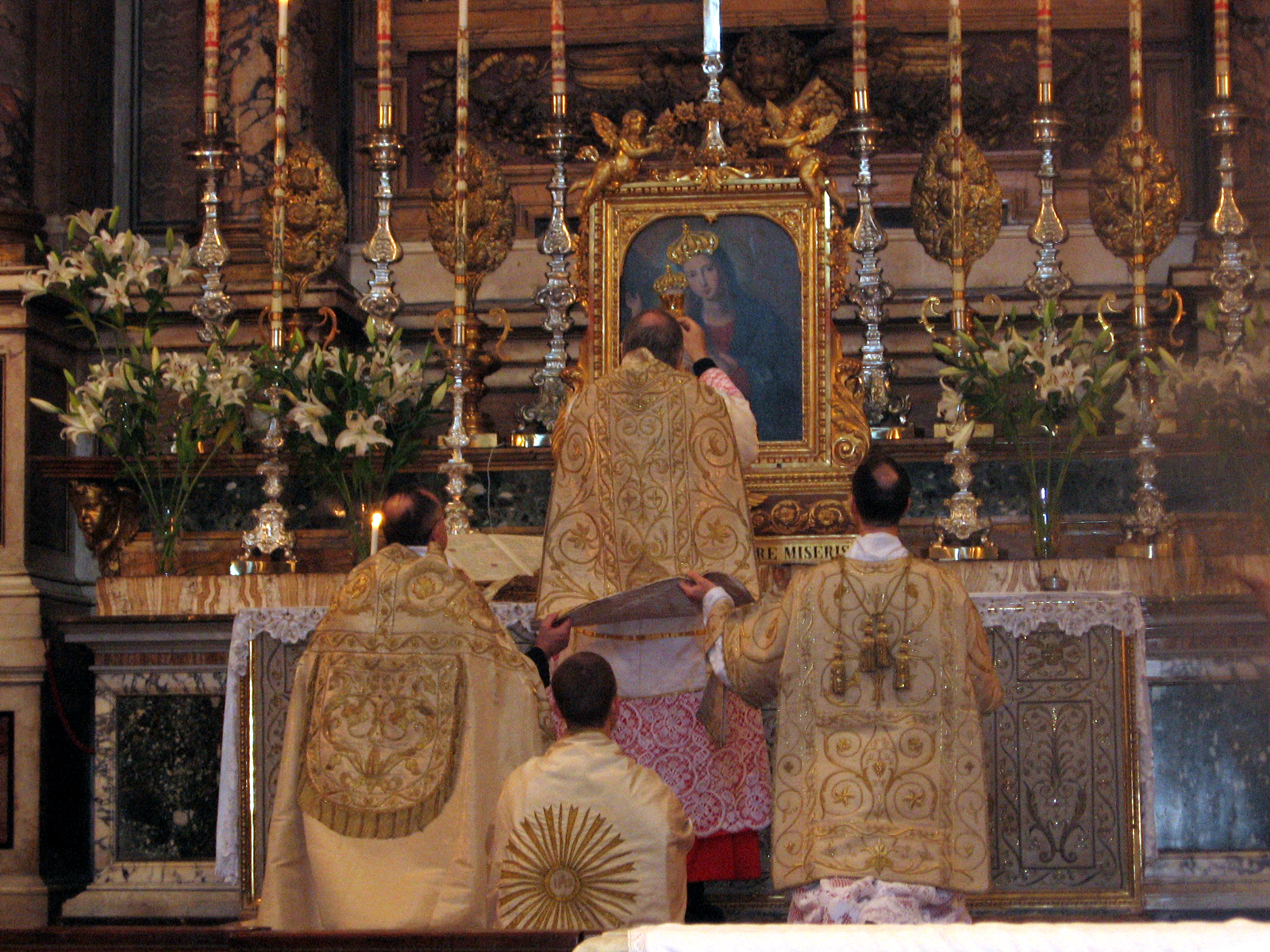
Pontifical High Mass in Santissima Trinità dei Pellegrini, Rome.

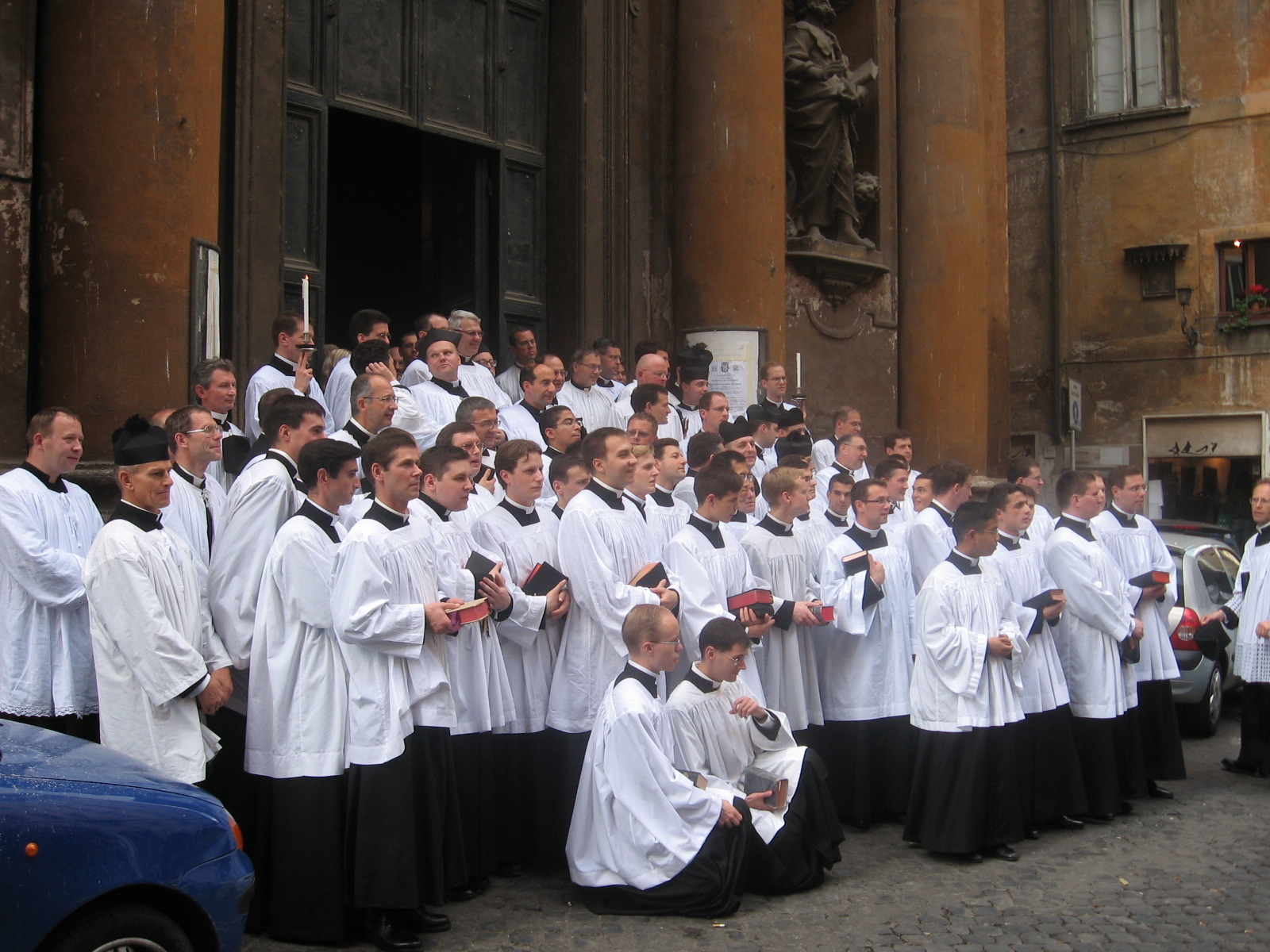
Members of the Priestly Fraternity of Saint Peter in Santissima Trinità dei Pellegrini, Rome.

This is a list of Catholic religious orders, congregations, institutes and societies of apostolic life that celebrate the traditional liturgical rites of the Latin Church, mainly the Traditional Latin Mass.

Most use a pre-1970 edition of the Roman Missal, usually the 1962 edition of this Missal, but some follow other Latin liturgical rites and thus celebrate not the Roman Rite but another form of liturgy permitted under the 1570 papal bull Quo primum, such as the Dominican, Carthusian or Carmelite Rites.

The traditional Latin rites were never abrogated by the Catholic Church, yet they were rarely used and sometimes prohibited by local authorities after 1970. To clarify the fact that the traditional Roman and other Latin liturgical rites had never been abrogated, and to expand and promote the ancient liturgy's use, Pope Benedict XVI issued in 2007 a motu proprio titled Summorum Pontificum, which was complemented by the instruction Universæ Ecclesiæ in 2011. This superseded previous documents already favorable to the traditional rites: Quattuor abhinc annos and Ecclesia Dei (both by John Paul II). However, Pope Francis established more restrictive conditions in 2021, with the motu proprio Traditionis custodes.

As of 2023, the largest priestly communities using the Traditional Latin Mass exclusively are the Priestly Fraternity of Saint Peter (FSSP) with 386 priests, Institute of Christ the King Sovereign Priest (ICKSP) with 147 priests and Institute of the Good Shepherd (IBP) with 62 priests. (Note: The Society of Saint Pius X (SSPX), with 707 priests, outnumbers them all, yet it is in an irregular canonical situation, lacking thus full communion with the Church's hierarchy.)

This list also includes, in the last section, groups that are not in full communion with the Holy See, and that lack canonical recognition thereof. (Note: The Catholic Church makes a distinction between full and partial communion: where full communion exists, there is but the one Church; partial communion, on the other hand, exists where some elements of Christian faith are held in common, but complete unity on essentials is lacking. Full communion involves completeness of "those bonds of communion – faith, sacraments and pastoral governance – that permit the Faithful to receive the life of grace within the Church.")

== Ecclesiastical jurisdictions ==
- Personal Apostolic Administration of Saint John Mary Vianney

Administratio Apostolica Sancti Ioannis Mariae Vianney
Erected by Pope John Paul II on 18 January 2002.
Scope: traditional clergy and laity within the Diocese of Campos, Brazil.
Members: 59 (34 priests) (2022)
Apostolic Administrator: Bishop Fernando Arêas Rifan.
Seminary: Immaculate Conception at Campos dos Goytacazes

== Clerical societies of apostolic life ==
- Priestly Fraternity of Saint Peter

Fraternitas Sacerdotalis Sancti Petri, FSSP
Founded at Hauterive Abbey on 18 July 1988, erected by the Pontifical Commission Ecclesia Dei on 18 October 1988 as a clerical society of apostolic life of pontifical right.
Scope: Sanctification of priests, works of apostolate.
Members: 579 (387 priests) (2025)
Superior General: Fr. John Berg.
Seminaries: Wigratzbad and Denton.
Liturgy: 1962 Roman Missal (exclusively).

- Institute of Christ the King Sovereign Priest

Founded in Gabon on 1 September 1990, erected by the Pontifical Commission Ecclesia Dei on 7 October 2008 as a clerical society of apostolic life of pontifical right.
Scope: Sanctification of priests, spreading the Kingdom of Christ.
Prior General: Rvd. Gilles Wach.
Seminary: International Saint Philip Neri Seminary in Gricigliano, Italy.
Liturgy: 1962 Roman Missal (exclusively).

- Institute of the Good Shepherd

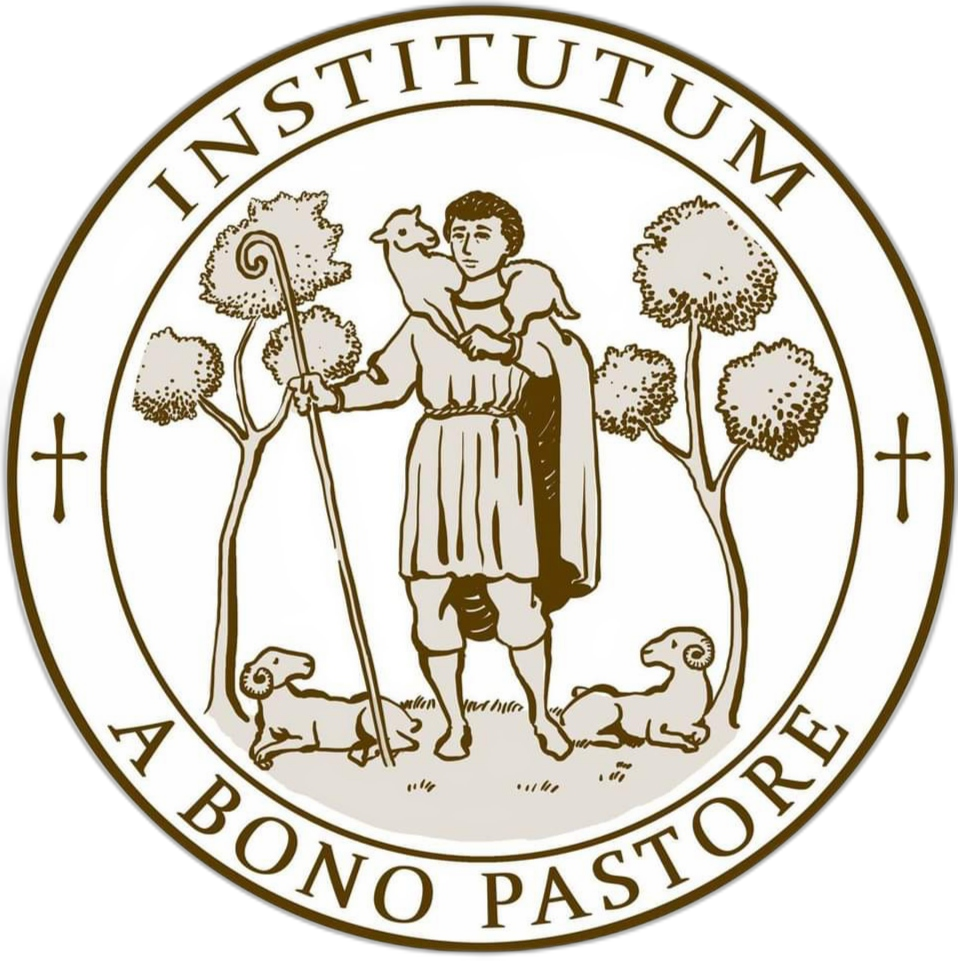

Latin: Institutum a Bono Pastore, French: Institut du Bon Pasteur: IBP
Erected by the Pontifical Commission Ecclesia Dei on 8 September 2006 as a clerical society of apostolic life of pontifical right.
Superior General: Rvd. Luis Gabriel Barrero Zabaleta.
Seminary: Saint Vincent de Paul Seminary at Courtalain.
Liturgy: 1962 Roman Missal (exclusively).

- Oratory of Saint Philip Neri
Confoederatio Oratorii Sancti Philippi Nerii, CO
Founded 15 July 1575.
Society of apostolic life of pontifical right.
Each house of Oratorians is autonomous, and numerous Oratories continue to also celebrate the Latin Mass:

- Oxford Oratory (Oxford, England)

- Institute of Saint Philip Neri
Institut Sankt Philipp Neri: ISPN
Founded February 2003, erected by the Pontifical Commission Ecclesia Dei on 26 May 2004 as a society of apostolic life of pontifical right.
Provost: Fr. Marco Piranty

- Institute of the Missionaries of the Holy Cross
Institutum Missionariorum a Sancta Cruce: MSC
Founded 6 August 1976, erected 24 June 2004 as society of apostolic life of pontifical right.
Scope: Contemplative and active life, schools and service to those in need.
Houses: 3
Members: 47 (13 priests), as of 2023.
Superior General: Rvd. Antonius Maria Mamsery

- Society of the Missionaries of Divine Mercy
Société des Missionnaires de la Miséricorde Divine, SMMD
Founded September 2005, erected in the Diocese of Fréjus-Toulon, France on 22 September 2007 as a public association of the faithful in via of becoming a society of apostolic life.
Scope: parish ministry, devotion to the Divine Mercy, New Evangelisation, specially among Muslims.
Members: 20 (10 priests)
Superior: Rvd. Jean-Raphaël Dubrule.
Seminary: Diocesan Seminary of the Immaculate Conception of La Castille, Toulon.

== Institutes of consecrated life, for men ==
=== Monastic communities ===
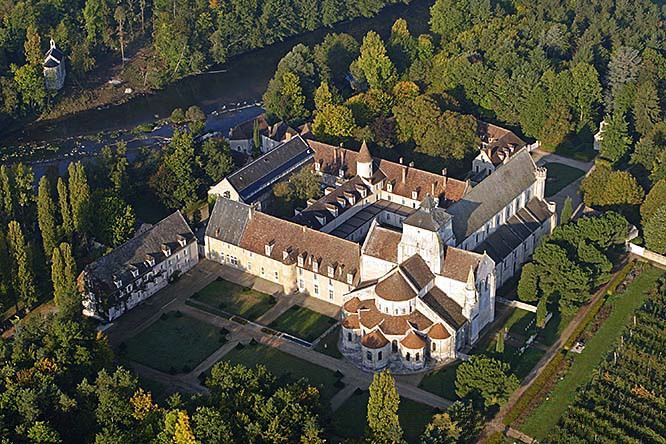
Fontgombault Abbey

- Abbey of Notre Dame of Fontgombault (Benedictines)

Abbaye de Notre-Dame de Fontgombault
Restored 1948 (foundation of Solesmes Abbey, member of the Solesmes Congregation).
Abbot: Dom Jean Pateau
Liturgy: Benedictine office (1965 Missal for the conventual mass)
(Diocese of Bourges, France)

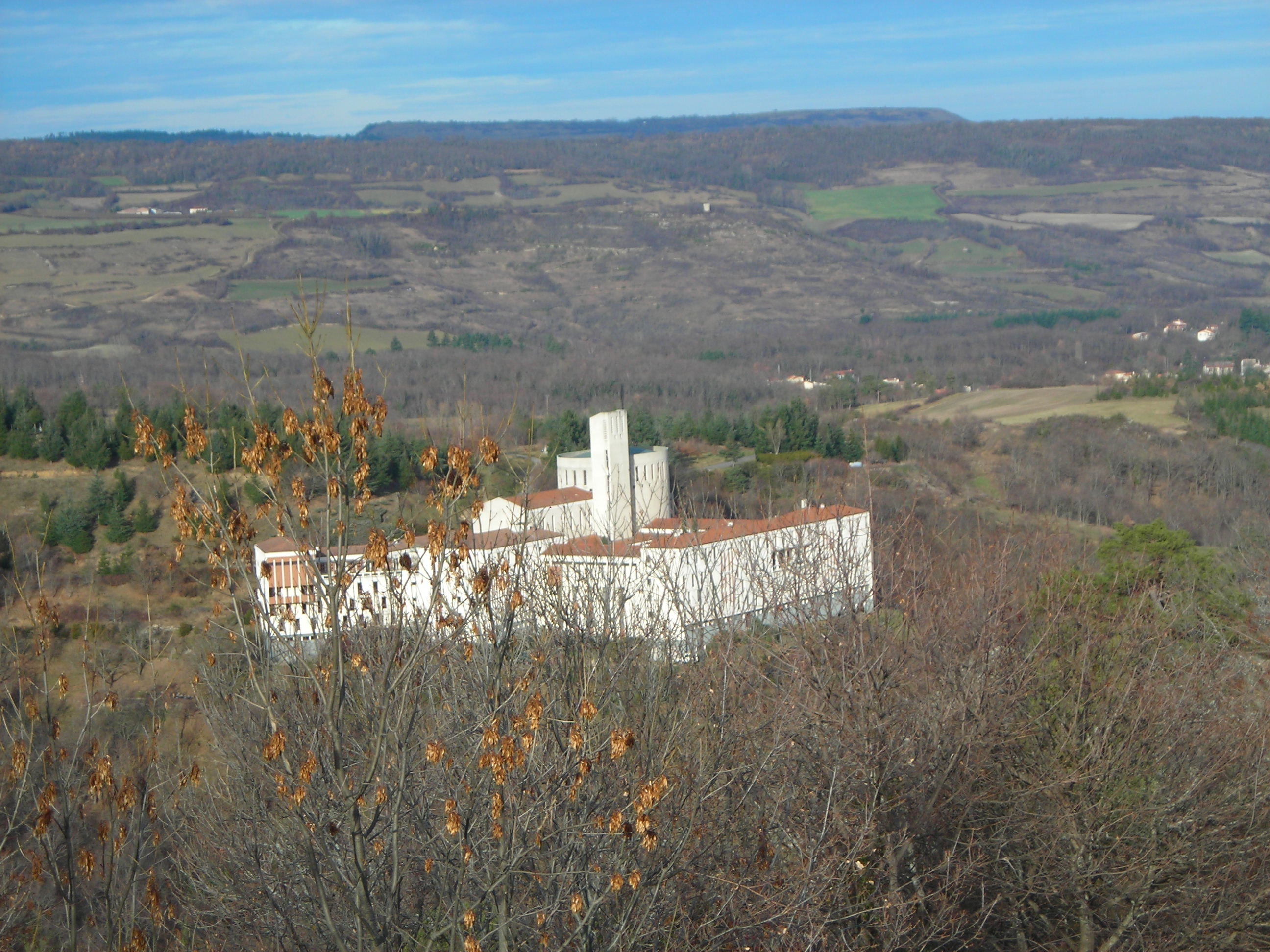
Randol Abbey

- Abbey of Our Lady of Randol (Benedictines)

Founded 1971 (foundation of Fontgombault, member of the Solesmes Congregation), erected 21 March 1981.
Abbot: Dom Bertrand de Hédouville
Liturgy: Benedictine office (1965 Missal for the conventual mass)
(Archdiocese of Clermont, France)

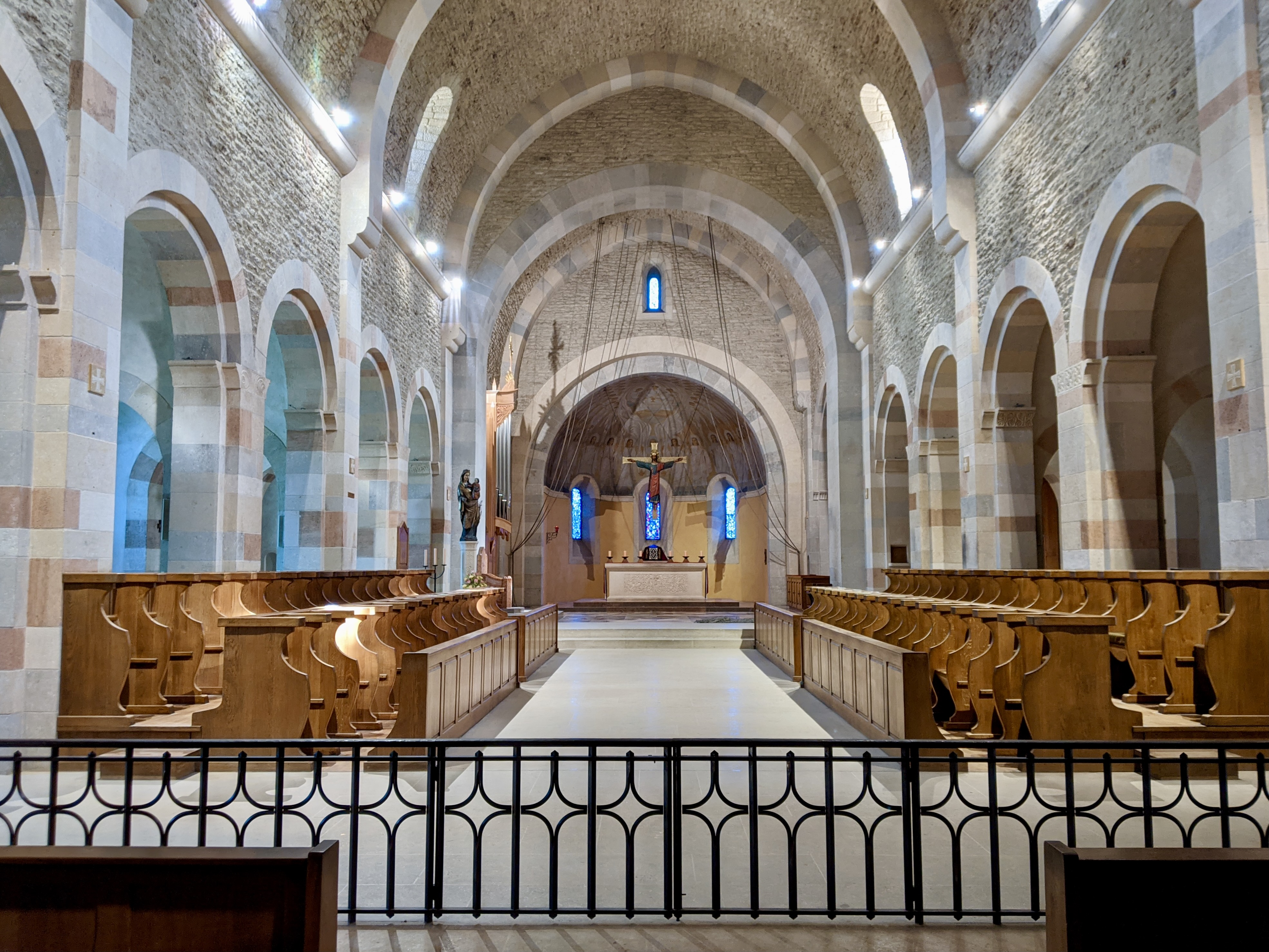
Le Barroux Abbey

- Abbey of Saint Mary Magdalene of Le Barroux (Benedictines)

Abbatia Sanctae Mariae Magdalenae, Abbaye Sainte-Madeleine du Barroux.
Founded 1970, erected 18 June 1989 (joined the Benedictine Confederation 25 September 2008, sui iuris).
Abbot: Dom Louis-Marie de Geyer d'Orth.
Liturgy: Benedictine office (1962 Missal (adapted) for the conventual mass)
(Archdiocese of Avignon, France)

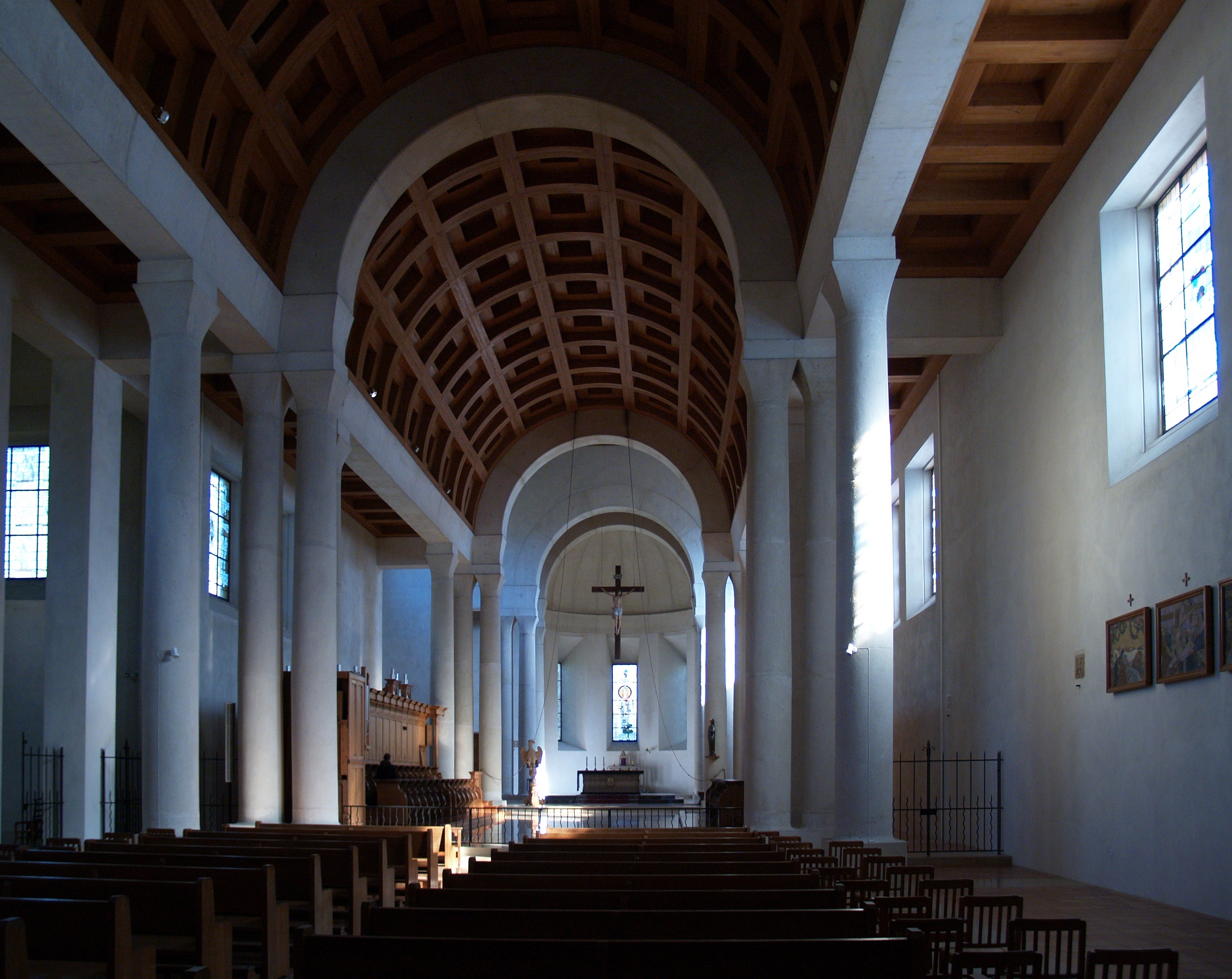
Triors Abbey

- Abbey of Our Lady of Triors (Benedictines)

Founded 1984 (foundation of Fontgombault, member of the Solesmes Congregation), erected as an abbey in 1994.
Abbot: Dom Louis Blanc
Liturgy: Benedictine office (1965 Missal for the conventual mass)
(Diocese of Valence, France)

- Abbey of Saint Joseph de Clairval (Benedictines)

Erected 2 February 1988, raised the status of an abbey in 1992 (member sui iuris of the Benedictine Confederation).
Liturgy: 2002 Missal for the conventual mass, 1962 Missal for most of the low masses.

- Abbey of Our Lady of the Annunciation of Clear Creek (Benedictines)

Founded 1999 (foundation of Fontgombault, member of the Solesmes Congregation), erected as a priory 11 February 2000, elevated to abbey 11 February 2010.
Abbot: Dom Philip Anderson.
Liturgy: Benedictine office (1965 Missal for the conventual mass)
(Diocese of Tulsa, Oklahoma)

- Abbey of Saint Mary of La Garde (Benedictines)

Founded 2002 (foundation of Le Barroux), erected as an abbey 13 February 2021 (joined the Benedictine Confederation in 2025, sui iuris).
Abbot: Dom Marc Guillot
Liturgy: Benedictine office (1962 Missal (adapted) for the conventual mass)
(Diocese of Agen, France)

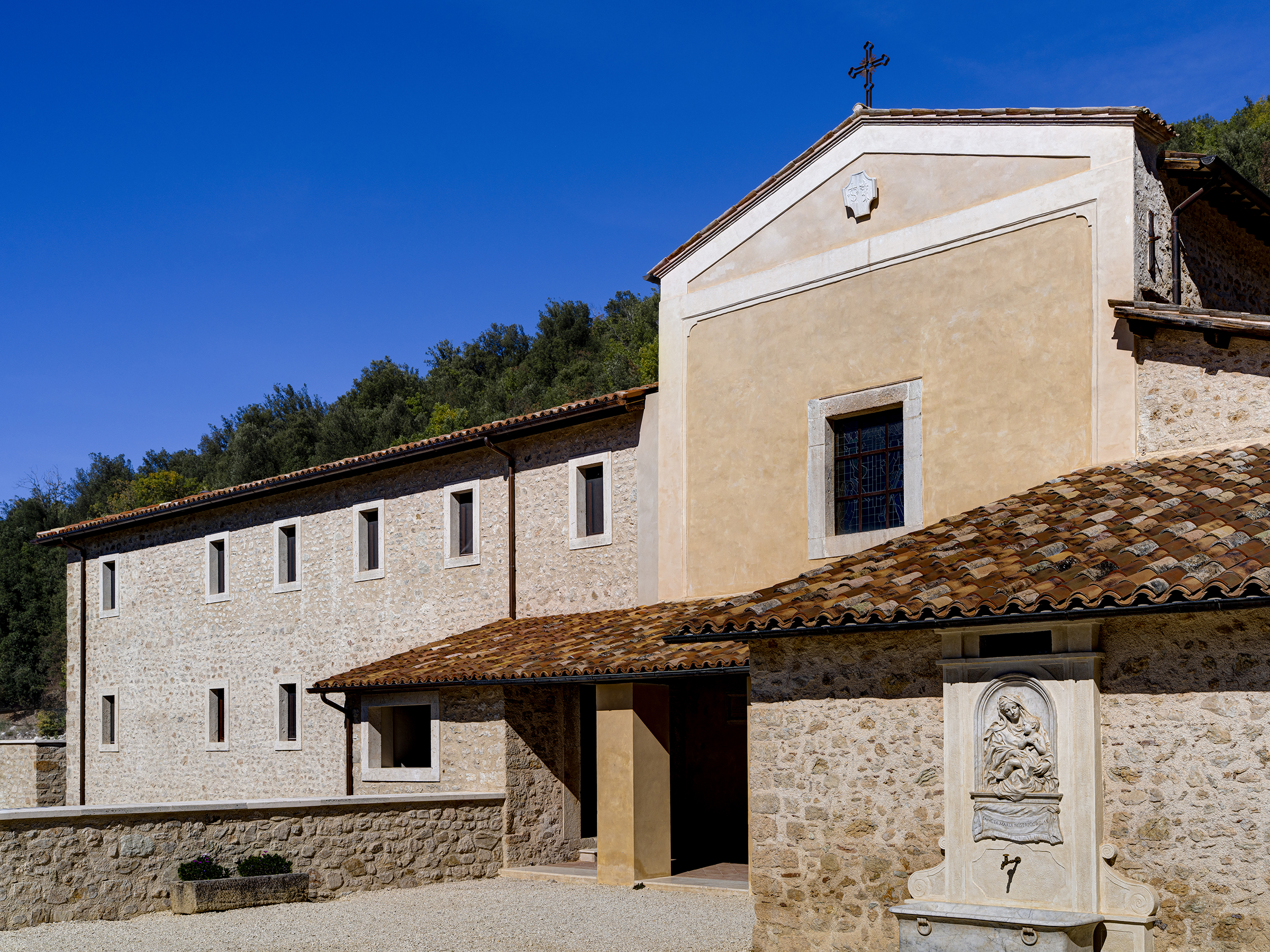
Norcia Abbey

- Abbey of Saint Benedict on the Mountain, Norcia (Benedictines)

Founded 1998, relocated 2016, erected as an abbey 25 May 2024 (member sui iuris of the Benedictine Confederation).
Abbot: Dom Benedict Nivakoff
Liturgy: Benedictine office
(Archdiocese of Spoleto-Norcia)

- Abbey of Saint Paul of Wisques (Benedictines)

Abbaye Saint-Paul de Wisques
Restored 1945 (foundation of Solesmes Abbey, member of the Solesmes Congregation), adopted the Traditional Latin Mass 11 October 2013 after the arrival of monks from Fontgombault Abbey.
Abbot: Dom Damien Thévenin
Liturgy: Benedictine office (1965 Missal for the conventual mass)
(Diocese of Arras, France)

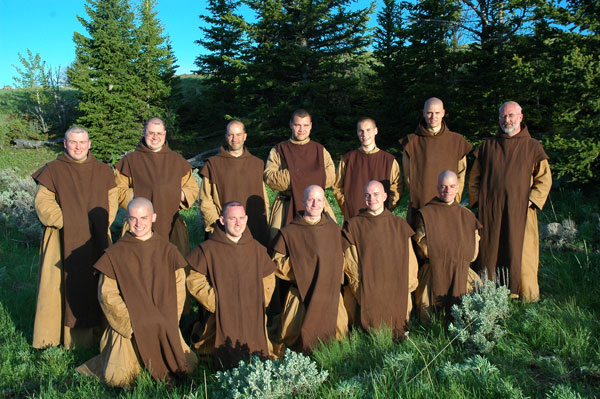
Carmelite monks

- Monks of the Most Blessed Virgin Mary of Mount Carmel (Carmelites)

Founded 15 October 2003 in the Diocese of Cheyenne.
Prior: Fr Daniel Mary Schneider.
Liturgy: Carmelite Rite.
(Diocese of Cheyenne, Wyoming)

- Monastery of Our Lady of Aysén (Schola Veritatis)

Founded in Tarazona in 2008, erected in the Diocese of Córdoba on 6 October 2011 as a public association of the faithful in via of becoming an Institute of Consecrated Life, moved to the Apostolic Vicariate of Aysén
Father General: Rvd. Fr. Pedro Pablo Silva Armanet
(Apostolic Vicariate of Aysén, Chile)

- Discalced Hermits of Our Lady of Mount Carmel (Carmelites)

Eremitae Discalceati Dominae Nostrae de Monte Carmelo
Erected 2018 (Diocese of Harrisburg).
Scope: Carmelite eremitical life in solitude and contemplation.
Liturgy: Carmelite Rite.
(Diocese of Harrisburg, Pennsylvania)

- Monastery of Saint Catherine of Siena (Benedictines of the Immaculate)

Benedictini Immaculatae Monaci
Founded 2008 in the diocese of Albenga-Imperia, relocated to Taggia in 2019.
(Diocese of Ventimiglia-Sanremo, Italy)

- Monastery of Our Lady of Glastonbury (Benedictines)

Erected 2021 in the Diocese of Clifton as a public association of the faithful, moved 2022 to Chavagnes-en-Paillers (France).
Liturgy: Benedictine office
(Diocese of Clifton, England)

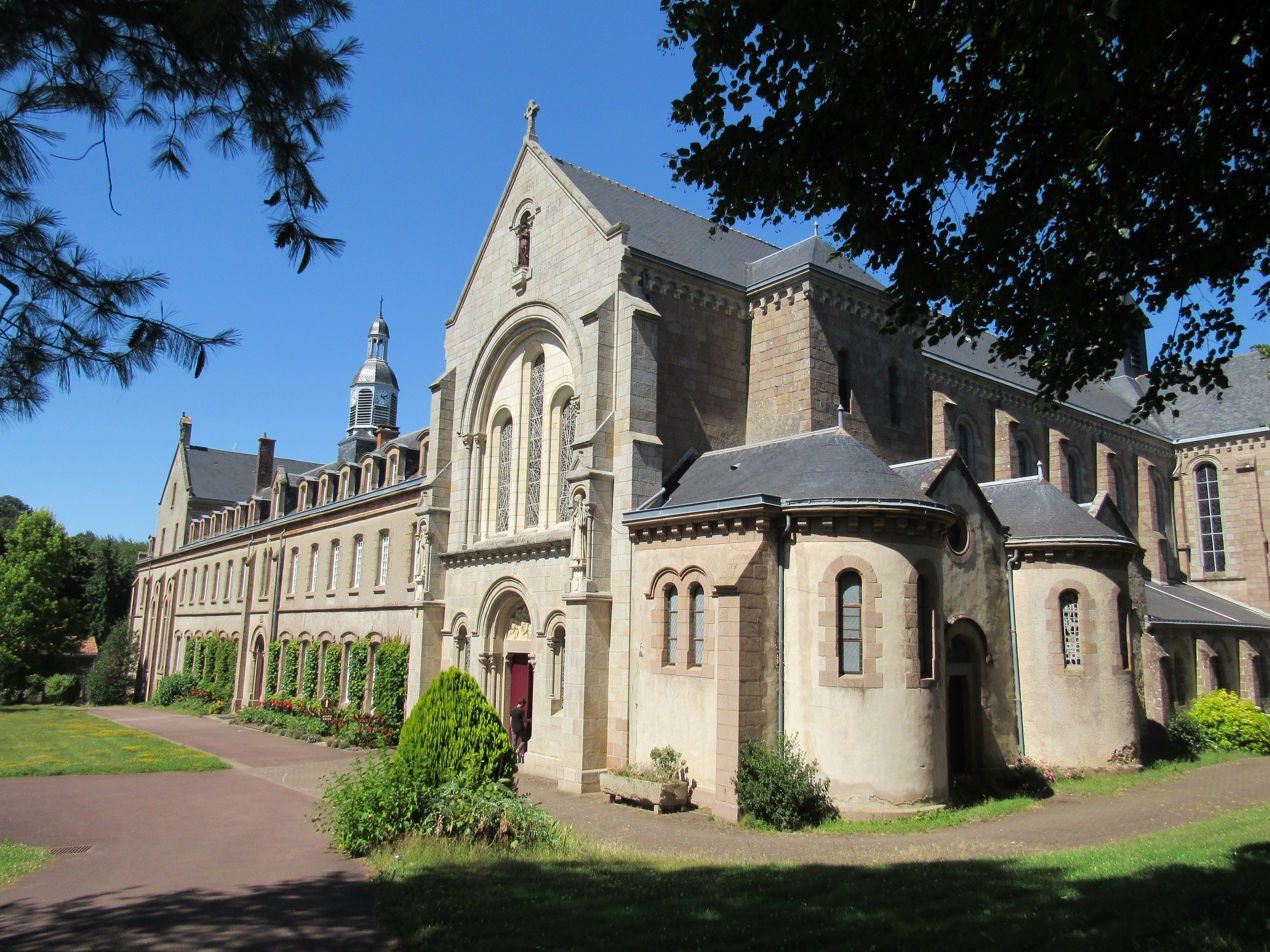
Bellefontaine Abbey

- Priory of Our Lady of Good Help of Bellefontaine, Bellefontaine Abbey (Benedictines)

Prieuré de Notre-Dame du Bon Secours de Bellefontaine, Abbaye de Bellefontaine.
Erected 11 July 2026 (foundation of Le Barroux).
Liturgy: Benedictine office (1962 Missal (adapted) for the conventual mass)
(Diocese of Angers, France)

=== Canons regular ===
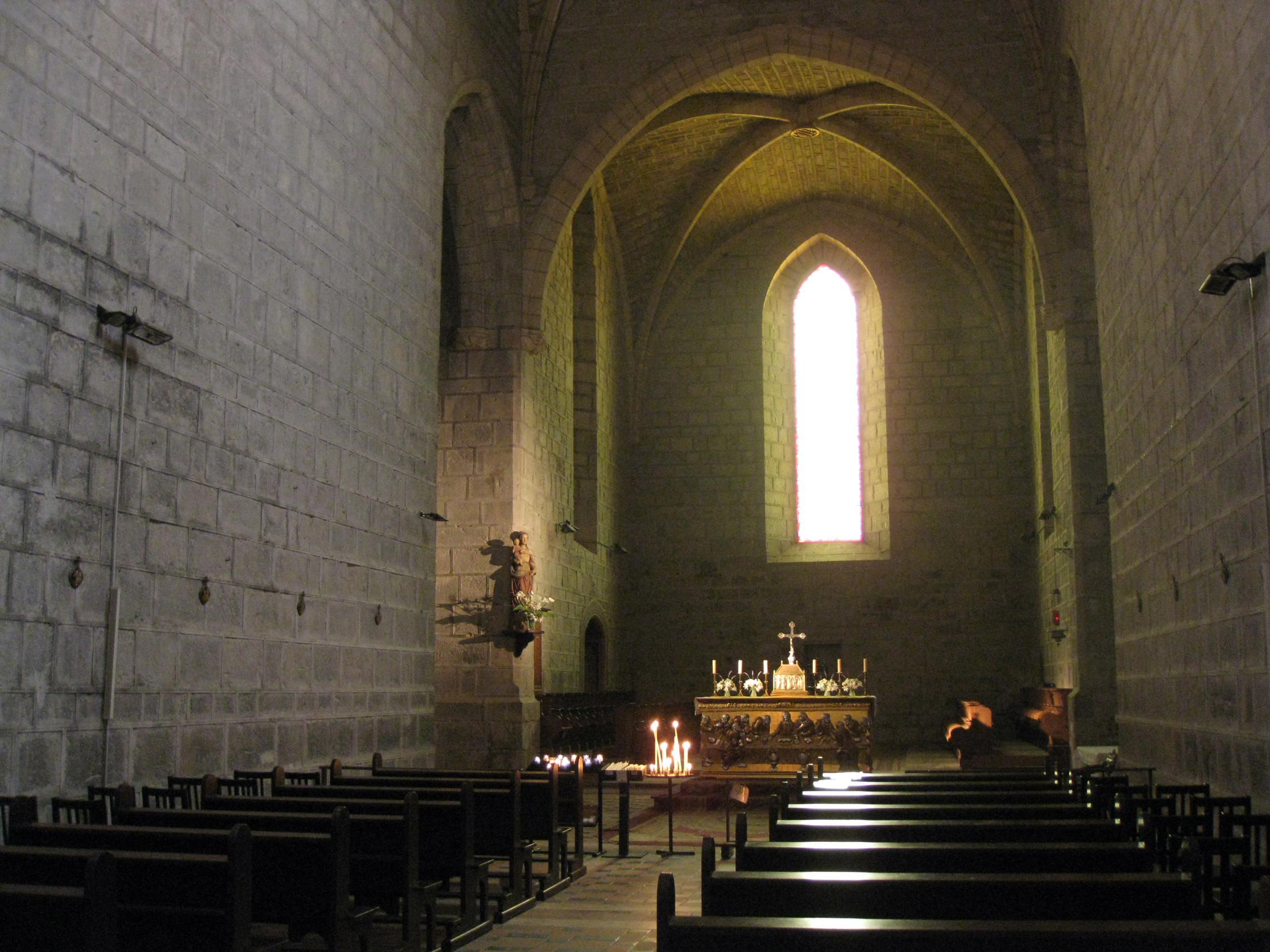
Lagrasse Abbey

- Canons Regular of the Mother of God

Canonici Regulares Matris Dei, C.R.M.D. (Canons of Lagrasse)
Erected 18 May 1997 as an abbey of pontifical right, installed in 2004 at the Abbey of Saint Mary of Lagrasse.
Houses: 2
Members: 36 (22 priests), as of 2023
Abbot: Fr. Emmanuel-Marie Le Fébure du Bus.
(Diocese of Carcassonne-Narbonne, France)

- Canons Regular of Saint John Cantius

SJC
Founded 1999.
Superior General: Very Rv Joshua Caswell
(Archdiocese of Chicago, Illinois)

Priory of the Annunciation of the Blessed Virgin Mary (Canons Regular of the New Jerusalem)

- Canons Regular of the New Jerusalem

CRNJ
Erected 22 June 2002 as a public association of the faithful (Diocese of La Crosse), moved and erected in the Diocese of Wheeling-Charleston 22 November 2013.
Prior: Fr Daniel Augustine Oppenheimer
(Diocese of Wheeling-Charleston, West Virginia)

- Canons Regular of Saint Thomas Aquinas

Founded 2012, erected as a private association of the faithful in via of becoming a monastery sui juris.
(Diocese of Springfield in Illinois)

=== Mendicant communities ===
- Order of Preachers (Dominicans)

Ordo Praedicatorum, OP
Founded 1215, approved 22 December 1216.
The Order of Preachers used the Dominican Rite for the mass and divine office until 1968, when the Order adopted the reformed rites. However, several dominican communities continue to also celebrate the mass according to the Dominican Rite:
- Priory of Our Lady of the Rosary and Saint Dominic (London, England)
- Priory of Saint Michael the Archangel (Cambridge, England)
- Priory of Saint Vincent Ferrer (Manhattan, New York)
- Priory of the Holy Rosary (Portland, Oregon)

- Fraternity of Saint Vincent Ferrer

Fraternitas Sancti Vincenti Ferreri, FSVF
Institute of pontifical right, founded in 1979, erected on 30 November 1988. The community dedicates itself to community life, work, study and apostolate. It has its monastery at Chémeré-le-Roi. Its current superior is Father Louis-Marie de Blignières.

=== Other religious institutes ===
- Servants of Jesus and Mary

Servi Jesu et Mariae, SJM
Founded 30 May 1988, erected as an institute of pontifical right on 16 July 1994.
Scope: Ignatian spirituality, evangelization of scouting
Superior General: Rvd. Fr. Markus Christoph
Seminary: St. Peter Canisius Seminary, Blindenmarkt (Austria)

- Fraternity of Saint Joseph the Guardian

Fraternitas Sancti Joseph Custodis, FSJC
Founded at Puchuncavi, Chile in 2002, erected at Cotignac (Diocese of Fréjus-Toulon) on 19 March 2010 as a public association of the faithful in via of becoming an Institute of Consecrated Life.
Scope: Preaching of missions, Spiritual Exercises and intellectual formation.
Moderator General: Rvd. Fr. Federico Alcaman Riffo.

- Slaves of the Immaculate Heart of Mary

Mancipia Immaculati Cordis Mariae, MIMC
Founded at Harvard, Massachusetts in 1976; regularised 2002; erected 10 October 2017 as a public association of the faithful in the Diocese of Worcester.
Superior: Br Thomas Augustine

=== Hermitages ===
Hermitage of Our Lady of the Enclosed Garden

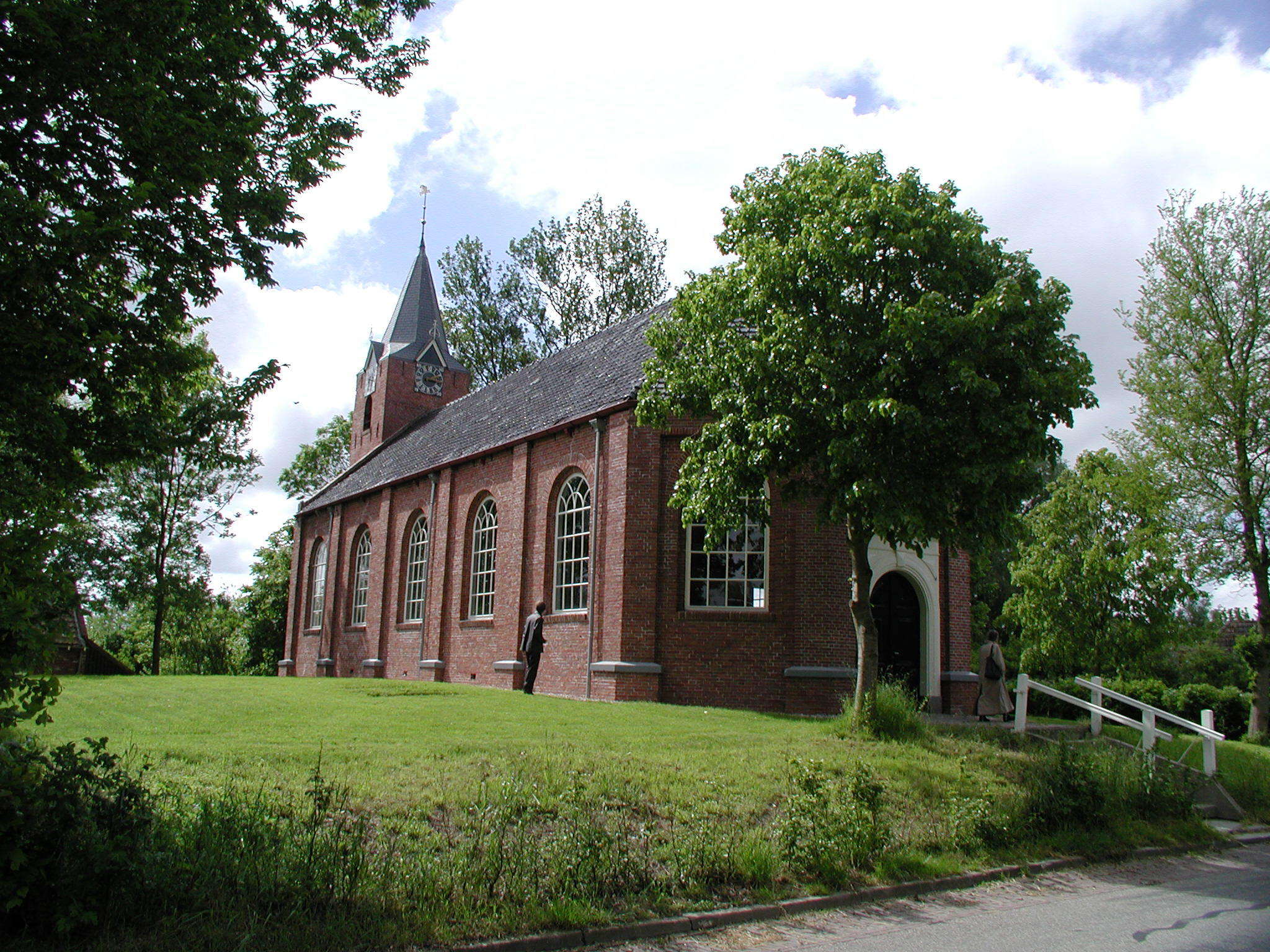
Hermitage of Our Lady of the Enclosed Garden.

(Dutch: Kluizenarij Onze Lieve Vrouwe van de Besloten Tuin).
Hermitage founded in 2001 and located in Warfhuizen, Netherlands. Its hermit was ordained a priest in September 2015.

Community	Abbreviation	Founded	Location	Rite
Religious Institute of the Holy Cross of Riaumont		1971	France	Roman (traditional)
Our Lady in Vyšší Brod Abbey (Cistercians)	OCist	1259	Czech Republic	Cistercian
Silverstream Priory (Benedictines)	OSB	2012	Ireland	Monastic (Note: Only for the Divine Office, as there is no Monastic rite of the Mass, for which community uses the Roman Rite (traditional).)
Notre Dame Priory (Benedictines)	OSB	2017	Tasmania	Monastic (Note: Only for the Divine Office, as there is no Monastic rite of the Mass, for which community uses the Roman Rite (traditional).)

Exclusively traditional Mass

United States

- Benedictines – Sprague, Washington

Not exclusively traditional Mass

International

- Fraternitas Beatissimae Virginis Mariae: Comunitates Iesus Sacerdos et Rex (Fraternity of the Blessed Virgin Mary: Community of Jesus Priest and King) (Houses in: Bagnoregio, Rome, and Genoa, Italy | Mailley le Château, France | Montreal, Canada)

Australia

- The Brisbane Oratory in Formation

Austria

- The Vienna Oratory

Canada

- The Toronto Oratory

England

- Benedictines – Belmont
- Benedictines – Farnborough
- The Birmingham Oratory
- The Oxford Oratory
- The London Oratory
- Marian Franciscans
- Premonstratensians – Chelmsford – Premonstratensian Rite
- The York Oratory
- The Manchester Oratory
- The Bournemouth Oratory

France

- Benedictines – Solignac

Ireland

- The Dublin Oratory in Formation

Italy

- Opus Mariae Matris Ecclesiae – Lunigiana

United States

- Apostles of Jesus Christ, Priest and Victim – Northlake, Illinois
- Austrian Congregation of Canons Regular – Canonry of Saint Leopold, Glen Cove, NY
- Congregation of the Oratory of Pharr – Pharr, Texas
- The Cincinnati Oratory – Cincinnati, Ohio
- The Raritan Oratory – Raritan, New Jersey
- The Contemplatives of St. Joseph Monastic Order – San Francisco, California
- Franciscans of Mary Immaculate – Warsaw, North Dakota
- The Institute of Saint Joseph – Diocese of La Crosse, Wisconsin
- Knights of the Holy Eucharist – Waverly, Nebraska
- Order of Carmelites – Troy, New York – Carmelite Rite

Wales

- The Cardiff Oratory

Do not offer Mass themselves

- Marian Friars Minor – Burnsville, North Carolina.
- Militia Templi – a lay society

== Institutes of consecrated life, for women ==
Community	Founded	Location	Rite
Societies of apostolic life
Sisters Adorers of the Royal Heart of Jesus Christ Sovereign Priest (Note: Female branch of the Institute of Christ the King Sovereign Priest.)	2001	International (Note: Houses in: England, France, Germany, Ireland, Italy, Switzerland, United States.)	Roman (traditional)
Filiæ Laboris Mariæ	2017	Missouri	Roman (traditional)
Monastic communities
Sisters Victims of the Sacred Heart of Jesus	1838	France	Roman (traditional)
Infant Jesus of Prague and St Joseph Monastery (Discalced Carmelites)	1907	Texas	Roman (traditional)
Oasis of Jesus Priest	1965	Spain	Roman (traditional)
Our Lady of the Assumption Abbey of Le Barroux (Benedictines)	1979	France	Monastic (Note: Only for the Divine Office. There is no Monastic rite of the Mass, for which community uses the Roman Rite (Traditional).)
Sisters of Carmel (Discalced Carmelites)	1987	Colorado	Roman (traditional)
Clare-Sisters of the Holy Family St. Laurenzen	1992	Switzerland	Roman (traditional)
Carmelites of the Holy Face of Jesus (O. Carm)	1995	Ireland	Roman (traditional)
Discalced Carmelite Monastery of Our Mother of Mercy and Saint Joseph	1997	South Dakota	Roman (traditional)
Carmel of Jesus, Mary, and Joseph, in Fairfield (Discalced Carmelites)	2000	Pennsylvania	Roman (traditional) (Note: The community uses the 'original Carmelite breviaries of St. John of the Cross and St. Teresa of Avila'.)
Mater Veritatis Monastery (Schola Veritatis)	2008	Chile	Roman (traditional)
Carmel of Elijah, in Mathoura (Discalced Carmelites)	2019	New South Wales	Roman (traditional)
Religious congregations, secular institutes and other associations of the faithful
Sisters of the Fraternity of Saint Joseph the Guardian (Note: Female branch of the Fraternity of Saint Joseph the Guardian.)	1999	France	Roman (both forms)

Exclusively traditional Mass

Colombia

- Esclavas Reparadoras de la Sagrada Familia (Reparative Slaves of the Holy Family) – Bogotá – associated with the Institute of the Good Shepherd

England

- Carmelite Monastery of the Annunciation – Birkenhead
- Lanherne Carmelite Convent (used by contemplative branch of Franciscan Sisters of the Immaculate) - Lanherne

France

- Chanoinesses de la Mère de Dieu (Canonesses of the Mother of God) – Azille

Italy

- Benedictine nuns of the Immaculate - Villatalla

Liechtenstein

- Sisters of the Precious Blood – Schellenberg

Mexico

- Religiosas Ecuménicas de Guadalupe – Tijuana, Baja California

Spain

- Oasis de Jesús Sacerdote (The Oasis of Jesus Priest)

Sweden

- Marias Lamm, Sankt Josefs Kloster - Imbramåla

Switzerland

- Sisters of the Precious Blood – St. Pelagiberg

United States

- Benedictines of Mary, Queen of Apostles – Gower, Missouri
- Brigittini Servitores Sanctissimi Salvatoris Institute – Tyler, Texas
- Discalced Carmelites of the Carmel of Jesus, Mary, and Joseph – Valparaiso, Nebraska
- Discalced Carmelite Nuns of the Carmel of the Holy Spirit – Littleton, Colorado
- Discalced Carmelite Nuns of the Monastery of the Little Flower of Jesus – Danbury, Connecticut
- Discalced Carmelites of the Carmel of Jesus, Mary, and Joseph - Post Falls, Idaho
- Filiae Laboris Mariae - Redfield, Kansas
- Poor Clare Nuns of Annunciation Monastery – Minooka, Illinois
- Servants of the Children of Light – Mandan, North Dakota
- Sisters, Slaves of the Immaculate Heart of Mary at the Saint Benedict Center – Still River, Massachusetts

Not exclusively traditional Mass

International

- Franciscan Sisters of the Immaculate (Missions in: Philippines | Kazakhstan | Holy Land | United States | Brazil | Argentina | Benin | Nigeria | Italy | United Kingdom | Poland | Portugal)
  - Contemplative Sisters of the Immaculate (Houses in: Imperia and Perugia, Italy | Cebu, Philippines)
- Trinitarians of Mary (Houses in: San Diego and West Covina, California | Lowell, Michigan | Guadalajara and Tecate, Mexico) Their institute was suppressed by Pope Francis on May 13, 2022, so they are no longer a religious entity within the Catholic Church and their vows were terminated.

England

- Benedictines – Herefordshire

France

- Benedictines – Rosans
- Carmelite Monastery of Alencon - Cuissai.

Italy

- Fraternitas Beatissimae Virginis Mariae: Comunitas Agnus Dei (Fraternity of the Blessed Virgin Mary: Community of the Lamb of God) – (Houses in: Bagnoregio | Gavi)

United States

- Children of Mary – Ohio (Houses in: Cincinnati | Newark)
- The Contemplatives of St. Joseph – San Francisco, California
- Carmelite Daughters of Elias
- Discalced Carmelites of the Carmelite Monastery of the Infant of Prague – Traverse City, Michigan
- Discalced Carmelite Nuns of the Carmel of Jesus, Mary, and Joseph – Kensington, California
- Daughters of Mary, Mother of Israel's Hope – Tulsa, Oklahoma
- Discalced Carmelites of Monastery of our Lady of Mt. Carmel and St. Joseph – Abington Twp, Pennsylvania
- Dominican Nuns of the Monastery of St. Jude – Marbury, Alabama – Dominican Rite and Tridentine Mass
- Franciscan Daughters of Mary – Covington, Kentucky
- Little Workers of the Sacred Hearts (Houses in: Connecticut | Philadelphia, PA | Riverdale, MD | Washington, DC)
- Marian Sisters of Santa Rosa – Santa Rosa, California
- Norbertine Canonesses – Tehachapi, California – Premonstratensian Rite
- Poor Sisters of St. Clare at Our Lady of the Angels Monastery – Fort Wayne, Indiana
- Sisters of Mary, Mother of the Church – Spokane, Washington

== Communities not canonically approved ==
- Society of Saint Pius X
  - 6 bishops, 733 priests, 264 seminarians (2026)
    - SSPX-affiliated religious orders
- SSPX Resistance
  - Society of St. Pius X– Marian Corp (SSPX-MC)
  - Société Sacerdotale des Apôtres de Jésus et Marie (SAJM)
  - Dominican-inspired Dominicans of Avrille - France
  - Família Beatae Mariae Virginis - Brasil
  - Benedictines-inspired Mosteiro da Santa Cruz - Brasil
  - Fraternidade Ordem da Mãe de Deus - Brasil
  - Benedictines-inspired Monastère Notre-Dame de Bellaigue - France
  - Missionary Sisters of Jesus and Mary - Nigeria
  - Benedictines-inspired Our Lady of Refuge Monastery - St. Mary’s, KS, USA.
- Roman Catholic Society of Pope Leo XIII (RCSPLXIII)
- Servants of the Holy Family
- Benedictines-inspired Monastère Saint-Benoît, Brignoles, Frejus-Toulon
- Benedictines-inspired Skita Patrum - France

=== Sedevacantist groups ===
- Congregation of Mary Immaculate Queen CMRI
  - The Sisters of Mary Immaculate Queen
  - The Religious Congregation of the Mother of God, staff 14 schools (2026) - USA and Canada
  - Congregation of the Blessed Virgin Mary of Mount Carmel - Swainsboro, GA, USA.
  - Capuchin Sisters of Saint Joseph - Burlington, CO, USA.
  - Hermanas de la Divina Providencia - Guadalajara, Mexico
- Sociedad Sacerdotal Trento,SST - Mexico
- Society of Saint Pius V SSPV
  - Daughters of Mary, Mother of Our Savior
- Guild of St. Peter ad Vincula
- St. Gertrude the Great Church
  - Oblates of the Holy Face - USA
- Fundación San Vicente Ferrer - Mexico
- Societas Sancti Joseph - Brasil
  - Obra Mariana Carmelitana - Guadalajara, Mexico
- Our Lady of Joy Mission - Canada - Trinidad and Tabago - South Africa.
- Compañía de Jesús y María - Argentina - USA - France.
- Congregation of the Sons of the Most Holy Redeemer (FSSR; Latin: Filii Sanctissimi Redemptoris). Founded on 8 December 1987, canonically erected on 15 August 2012, became sedevacantist on 2 May 2026. - UK - New-Zealand - Samoa

=== Sedeprivationist groups ===
- Istituto Mater Boni Consilii
- Orthodox Roman Catholic Movement (defunct)
- Roman Catholic Institute - USA - France - UK - Australia.
  - Most Holy Trinity Seminary
  - Sisters of Saint Thomas Aquinas - Brooksville, Florida

=== Independent groups ===
- Fraternité Notre-Dame
- Slaves of the Immaculate Heart of Mary (Richmond, New Hampshire)

== See also ==
- List of Traditional Catholic groups
