= Quattuor abhinc annos =

Incipit of a letter

Quattuor abhinc annos (Latin for "four years ago") is the incipit of a letter that the Congregation for Divine Worship and the Discipline of the Sacraments sent on 3 October 1984 to presidents of episcopal conferences concerning celebration of Mass in the Tridentine form.

== History ==
The letter explained that previously Pope John Paul II had invited comments from the bishops concerning the reception of the Missal promulgated in 1970 by authority of Pope Paul VI in accordance with the decisions of the Second Vatican Council, and any difficulties arising in the implementation of the liturgical reform. The Congregation subsequently granted diocesan bishops an indult to authorize specified priests and groups of the faithful who requested it, celebration of the Tridentine Mass according to the 1962 Roman Missal promulgated by Pope John XXIII. The permitted Tridentine Masses were to be in full accord with the 1962 Missal and in Latin.

This was not the first time that such an indult had been granted: after the promulgation of the Ordo Missae of 1970, Pope Paul VI issued a letter on 30 October 1971, the so-called Agatha Christie indult, which gave permission to a large segment of priests in the United Kingdom to retain the usage of the classical Roman Rite.

== Content ==
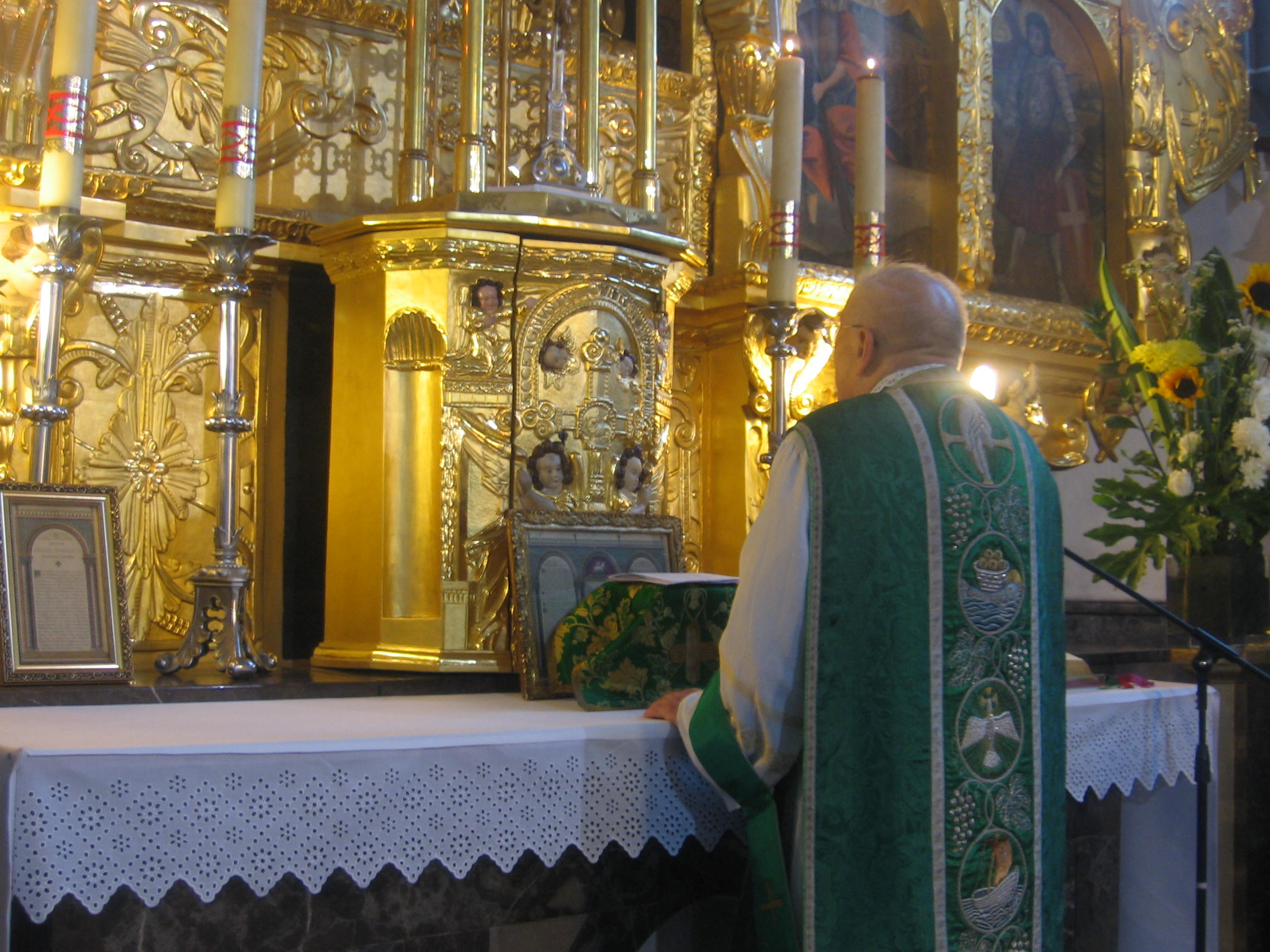
Tridentine Low Mass by a priest wearing a maniple on his left arm, Szydłowiec, Poland

An important condition for granting the requests was "that it be made publicly clear beyond all ambiguity that such priests and their respective faithful in no way share the positions of those who call in question the legitimacy and doctrinal exactitude of the Roman Missal promulgated by Pope Paul VI in 1970."

Diocesan bishops refused many requests by people whom they considered not to have met this condition. But authorization was in fact granted either by diocesan bishops or directly by the Holy See to many priests, parishes and priestly societies, who could then use the older forms of the Roman Rite either exclusively or only on occasion. The priestly societies included the Priestly Fraternity of St. Peter, the Institute of Christ the King Sovereign Priest, and the Personal Apostolic Administration of Saint John Mary Vianney. These used the "Tridentine" liturgical books exclusively, not only for celebrating Mass but also for the other sacraments and rituals and for the Divine Office. Individual priests and communities belonging to religious institutes also received the same authorization. There were such cases among the Fraternity of Saint Vincent Ferrer, the Institute of Saint Philip Neri, the Canons Regular of the New Jerusalem, the Canons Regular of Saint John Cantius, the monasteries of Sainte Madeleine du Barroux and Sainte Marie de la Garde. Various diocesan clergy also availed of the document's provision. See Communities using the Tridentine Mass for a list of priestly societies and religious institutes which celebrate the Tridentine Mass.

The Pope further expanded upon this with the motu proprio Ecclesia Dei of 1988, in which he exhorted the bishops to be generous in granting such a faculty for all the faithful who requested it. Ecclesia Dei supersedes Quattuor abhinc annos regarding the extent of the privilege.

Groups such as the Society of St. Pius X, who maintained that they needed no permission to celebrate the Tridentine Mass, decried the document and referred rather derisively to Masses celebrated with the Quattuor abhinc annos authorization as "Indult Masses". Several of these groups, such as the Society of St. Pius V, preferred to celebrate Mass according to pre-1962 editions of the Roman Missal.

The view that use of the earlier form of the Roman liturgy had never been formally abrogated was authoritatively confirmed by Pope Benedict XVI, who declared that permission to use it (which can be granted by the priest in charge of the church) is required only for public celebration.

Pope Benedict XVI revoked the directives on 7 July 2007, replacing them with the norms enunciated in his motu proprio Summorum Pontificum.

== See also ==
- Preconciliar rites after the Second Vatican Council
- Ecclesia Dei
