= Tridentine =

Tridentine is the adjectival form of Trent, Italy (Latin: Tridentum).

It also refers to:

- The Council of Trent and what followed it
  - The Tridentine calendar
  - The Tridentine Mass

== See also ==
- Counter-Reformation
- List of communities using the Tridentine Mass
- Pre-Tridentine Mass
- Traditionalist Catholicism
