= Society of the Missionaries of Divine Mercy =

- Société des Missionnaires de la Miséricorde Divine
- Abbreviation: SMMD
- Formation: 2005
- Founder: Fr. Fabrice Loiseau
- Founded at: Fréjus-Toulon
- Superior: Fr. Jean-Raphaël Dubrule
- Parent organization: Catholic Church
- Website: misericordedivine.fr

The Society of the Missionaries of Divine Mercy (french: Société des Missionnaires de la Miséricorde Divine) is a Catholic society of apostolic life dedicated to Eucharistic adoration and evangelising among Muslims.

The order was founded in 2005 in the Roman Catholic Diocese of Fréjus-Toulon, by Fabrice Loiseau, priest of the Fraternity of Saint Peter. The order's charism consists in spreading the devotion of the Divine Mercy (revealed by Christ to Saint Faustina Kowalska), celebrating the Eucharist in the Extraordinary Form of the Roman Rite (in the spirit of Benedict XVI's Summorum Pontificum) and taking active part in the New Evangelisation, specially among muslims.

In 2024 it was suspended from celebrating new ordinations. This was because the order asked the ordinations to be in the Tridentine Mass, and that their newly ordained priest be granted the faculties to celebrate this rite, which the order uses almost exclusively. However, after a "confident and peaceful dialogue between the order's superior and the Dicastery for Divine Worship and the Discipline of the Sacraments", six seminarians were ordained deacons in December 2024, in a Pontifical High Mass celebrated by bishop François Touvet.
