= Monastère Saint-Benoît de Brignoles =

Benedictine monastery in France

Monastère Saint-Benoît
- Monastère Saint-Benoît
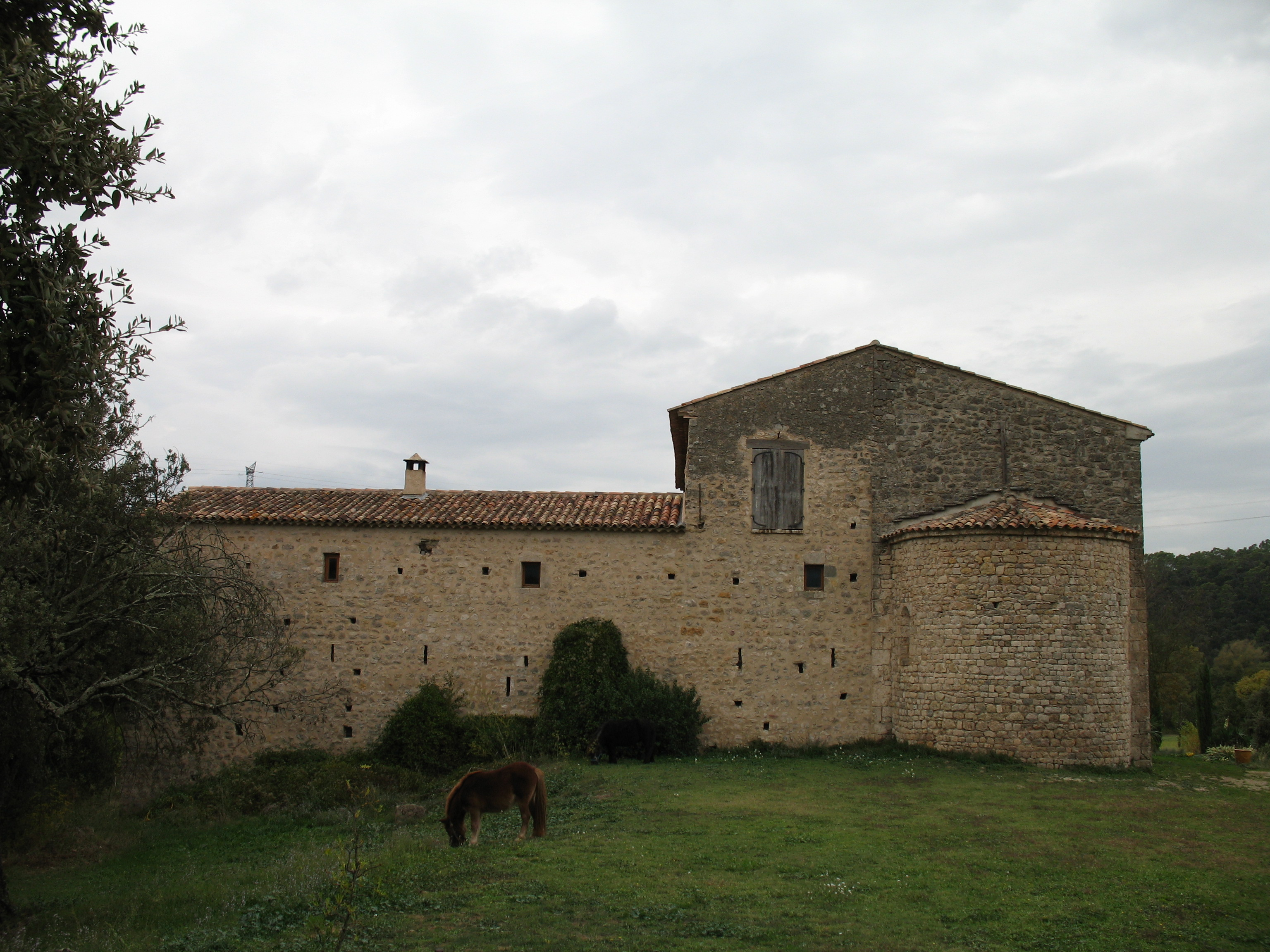
- Interactive map of Monastère Saint-Benoît

Monastery information
- Other name: Domaine de Saint-Christophe
- Order: Order of Saint Benedict
- Established: 2011
- Dedicated: 15 August 2020
- Diocese: Fréjus-Toulon

People
- Founder: Dom Alcuin Reid

Architecture
- Status: Active
- Heritage designation: Registered historical monument (1984)
- Style: Romanesque

Site
- Location: Brignoles
- Country: France
- Coordinates: 43°25′12″N 6°07′20″E
- Public access: Yes
- Website: Official website

The Monastère Saint-Benoît is an independent anglophone Catholic Benedictine monastery located in the commune of Brignoles, 46 kilometres (29 mi) from Toulon, France. The Bishop of Fréjus-Toulon established the monastery in 2011. The current location was purchased in 2020. The Association was suppressed in June 2022 after two members of the community were ordained priest and deacon without the bishop's knowledge. The monastery is still open and the monks have indicated they intend to continue their life of prayer, study and work, regardless of the outcome.

== History of the location ==
=== The Templars and the Hospitallers ===
At the beginning of the 11th century, a family from Rians built the Romanesque church, which they later gave, in 1025, to the abbey of Saint-Victor de Marseille. It was later acquired by the Order of the Templars in the 12th century, shortly after their creation. The Knights Templar enlarged the domain by constructing new buildings, which took the name of Saint-Christophe because it was now suitable for receiving pilgrims on their way to the Holy Land, via the nearby Via Aurelia.

In 1312, when Pope Clement V ordered the dissolution of the Order, this house of the Templars (or secondary commandery) came under the jurisdiction of the Order of St. John of Jerusalem, then under the commandery of Beaulieu.

=== Buildings ===
The monastery buildings were listed as historical monuments on 21 December 1984. The site is also listed as a cultural heritage monument. The monastery is the depository of several monastic relics, including Blessed Notker the Stammerer and Saint Lambert of Maastricht.

=== 21st century ===
The old commandery came back to religious life in August 2020, when several members of the members Monastère Saint-Benoît, already present in La Garde-Freinet since 2011, purchased the property. The monastery was dedicated to Saint Benedict of Nursia, the monastery church was once again given its medieval dedication to Saint Christopher. Building projects to restore the heritage buildings are underway.

== Monastic community ==
The monastic community was established on December 7, 2011 as a Public Association of the Faithful by Dominique Rey, bishop of Fréjus-Toulon and follows the rule of Saint Benedict in its daily life; the prayers of the canonical hours punctuate the routines of the day. The monastery celebrates the offices according to the older monastic and Tridentine Rite. During Holy Week, the Roman Missal of 1953, the edition before the reorganization of Pope Pius XII, is used. Australian Dom Alcuin Reid is its founder and prior.

The monastic community consists of three monks, of whom one is solemnly professed, another monk is in simple vows, and the third is a novice, clothed on 21 January 2024. Noviciate is a minimum of one year but may be extended as necessary up to two years.

The community receives large numbers of vocation enquiries and a constant stream of vocation visitors throughout the year. A major concern is to have sufficient accommodation for guests and prospective members. The number of the monastery's oblates and associates continues to grow.

=== Ordination and suppression ===
Dom Alcuin Reid was ordained a priest, with another monk ordained a deacon, clandestinely and outside France, in April 2022. The community defended the ordination as necessary to protect the liturgical integrity of the monastery, which had lacked a resident priest, after a canonical visitation of the Diocese of Fréjus-Toulon prevented bishop Rey from ordaining a priest for the monastery.

The bishop responded by suspending the two monks ordained, indicating that he had not given authorization for this ordination. On 10 June 2022, Bishop Rey suppressed the public association of the faithful "under pressure from the Vatican." The monks have appealed the suppression and intend to continue their life of prayer, study and work, regardless of sanctions imposed on them by Church authorities.
