= Canons Regular of the New Jerusalem =

Catholic organization in West Virginia, US

- Abbreviation: CRNJ
- Formation: 22 June 2002
- Founder: Daniel Augustine Oppenheimer
- Founded at: Chesterfield, Missouri, US
- Type: Institute of Consecrated Life
- Location: Charles Town, West Virginia, US
- Website: www.canonsregular.com

The Canons Regular of the New Jerusalem is a public association of the faithful in the Catholic Church, founded in 2002 in the Diocese of La Crosse, Wisconsin, and currently located in Charles Town, West Virginia after a period in Chesterfield, Missouri in the Archdiocese of Saint Louis, in the United States. The group operates under the authority of Bishop Evelio Menjívar-Ayala who was preceded by Bishop Mark E. Brennan, the current diocesan bishop of the Diocese of Wheeling-Charleston.

== Description ==
The institute was founded by then-Bishop (later Cardinal) Raymond Leo Burke and Dom Daniel Augustine Oppenheimer, Prior.

This institute celebrates the traditional Latin Liturgy (Tridentine Mass) according to the rites of 1962, as promulgated by Pope John Paul II's motu proprio Ecclesia Dei of 1988. The members live in community under the Augustinian Rule, taking vows of stability, conversion of life, obedience, and common life.

Their habit consists of a white robe, coming from previous orders and reform movements in the church, a belt, a white scapular, a black camail or capuche, and a rochet for liturgical services.

== See also ==
- Canons Regular
- Rule of St. Augustine
- List of communities using the Tridentine Mass
