= Louis-Marie de Blignières =

French Catholic priest (born 1949)

Very Reverend Father Louis-Marie de Blignières F.S.V.F.
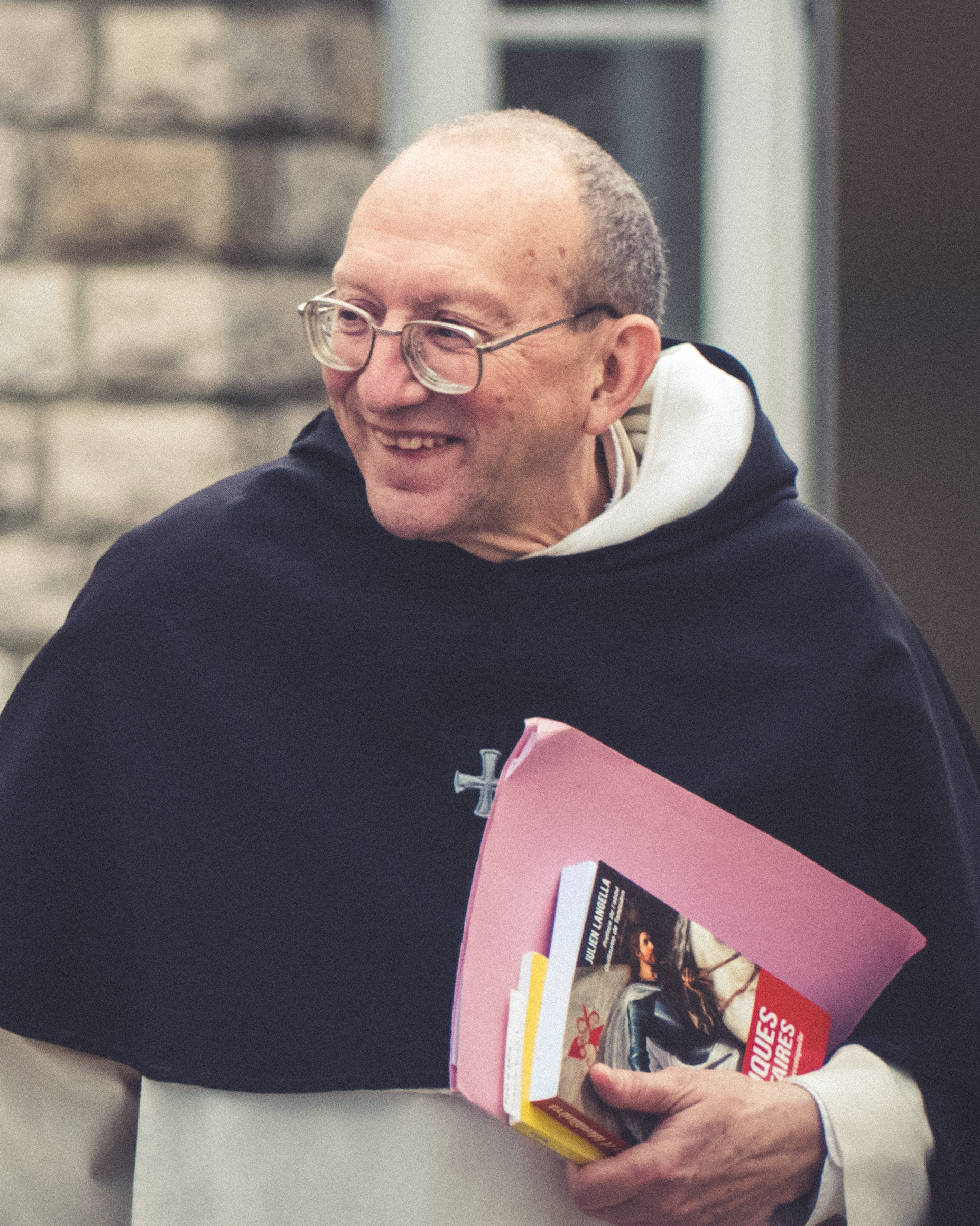
- Born: 11 April 1949 (age 77); Madrid, Spain
- Known for: Founding the Fraternity of Saint Vincent Ferrer

Louis-Marie de Blignières, born Olivier de Blignières on April 11, 1949, in Madrid) is a French traditionalist Catholic priest, and the founder of the Fraternity of Saint Vincent Ferrer.

== Biography ==
The son of Hervé Le Barbier de Blignières, he was born in Madrid in 1949. He did primary and secondary in classics at Paris (1956–1967), and higher studies in science at L'école Sainte-Geneviève de Versailles and the Faculté des Sciences d'Orsay (1967–1972). He obtained a master in Mathematics-Physics and a Certificate of Higher Studies in Astrophysics.

He entered an apostolic Benedictine community in Martigny in Valais in Switzerland (1972–1975) and studied in the Econe Seminary. While there, he was influenced by Dominican theologian Michel-Louis Guérard des Lauriers, who was then a professor at the seminary. He was ordained a priest of the Society of Saint Pius X in 1977 by Archbishop Marcel Lefebvre.

In 1979, he embraced des Lauriers' schismatic theory of sedeprivationism. He also received the Dominican habit from des Lauriers and founded the Fraternity of Saint Vincent Ferrer at Chémeré-le-Roi in Mayenne. However, by 1987, he and his community abandoned their support of sedeprivationism and fully entered the Catholic Church. The community is authorised to use the Dominican Rite and the Dominican Breviary due to an indult granted to them by Pope John Paul II in 1988. He was the prior of his abbey until 2011.

He gave a course in Thomist spirituality in Paris and preached retreats on the Rosary, afterwards he became known for his retreats and preaching. He also participates in the annual Chartres Pilgrimage with fellow traditionalists who are in good standing with the catholic church.

In 2003, he defended a doctoral thesis entitled La quête de la Ratio Entis: un itinéraire thomasien à l'Université Paris-Sorbonne. The director of his thesis was Michel Podgorny.

He is the author of the books Les fins dernières and other books. He leads the training seminars for students and young professionals, (Café-Caté), in the Latin Quarter of Paris.

== Works ==
- de Blignières, Louis-Marie (1994). Les fins dernières. Éditions Dominique Martin Morin. ISBN 9782856521960.
- de Blignières, Louis-Marie (2008). Le mystère de l'Être. L'approche thomiste de Guérard des Lauriers. Preface by Serge-Thomas Bonino. Paris: J. Vrin.
- de Blignières, Louis-Marie (2011). De Marie à la Trinité - méditations sur les mystères du Rosaire. Preface by Henri Brincard. Poitiers: Éditions Dominique Martin Morin. ISBN 978-2-85652-320-9.
- de Blignières, Louis-Marie (2013). Le mystère du Christ. Paris, France. ISBN 978-2856523407.

== See also ==
- Fraternity of Saint Vincent Ferrer
- Catholic traditionalism
