= Fraternity of Saint Vincent Ferrer =

Religious community

- The coat of arms of the Fraternity of Saint Vincent Ferrer
- Formation: 1979; 47 years ago
- Type: Clerical Religious Congregation of Pontifical Right (for Men)
- Headquarters: Couvent Saint Thomas d'Aquin, F-53340 Chémeré-le-Roi, France
- Location: 53,340 Chémeré-le-Roi, France
- Members: 21 members (12 priests) (2016)
- Superior General: Fr. Augustin-Marie Aubry, F.S.V.F.
- Key people: Rev. Louis-Marie de Blignières (founder)
- Website: http://www.chemere.org/

The Fraternity of Saint Vincent Ferrer (French: Fraternité Saint Vincent Ferrier; Latin: Fraternitas Sancti Vincenti Ferreri; abbreviated FSVF) is a Catholic religious institute of pontifical right in full communion with the Holy See that follows Dominican spirituality and uses the traditional Dominican Rite. It is named after Saint Vincent Ferrer, a Valencian Dominican priest.

== History ==
The fraternity was founded in 1979 by Louis-Marie de Blignières and was initially sedeprivationist, but later reconciled with the Holy See and became a religious institute of pontifical right on 30 November 1988. The fraternity's priests use the traditional Dominican Rite for saying Mass and the hours of the Divine Office and are authorized to use the Dominican constitutions and habit, due to an indult granted to them in 1988. It is not a part of the Dominican Order.

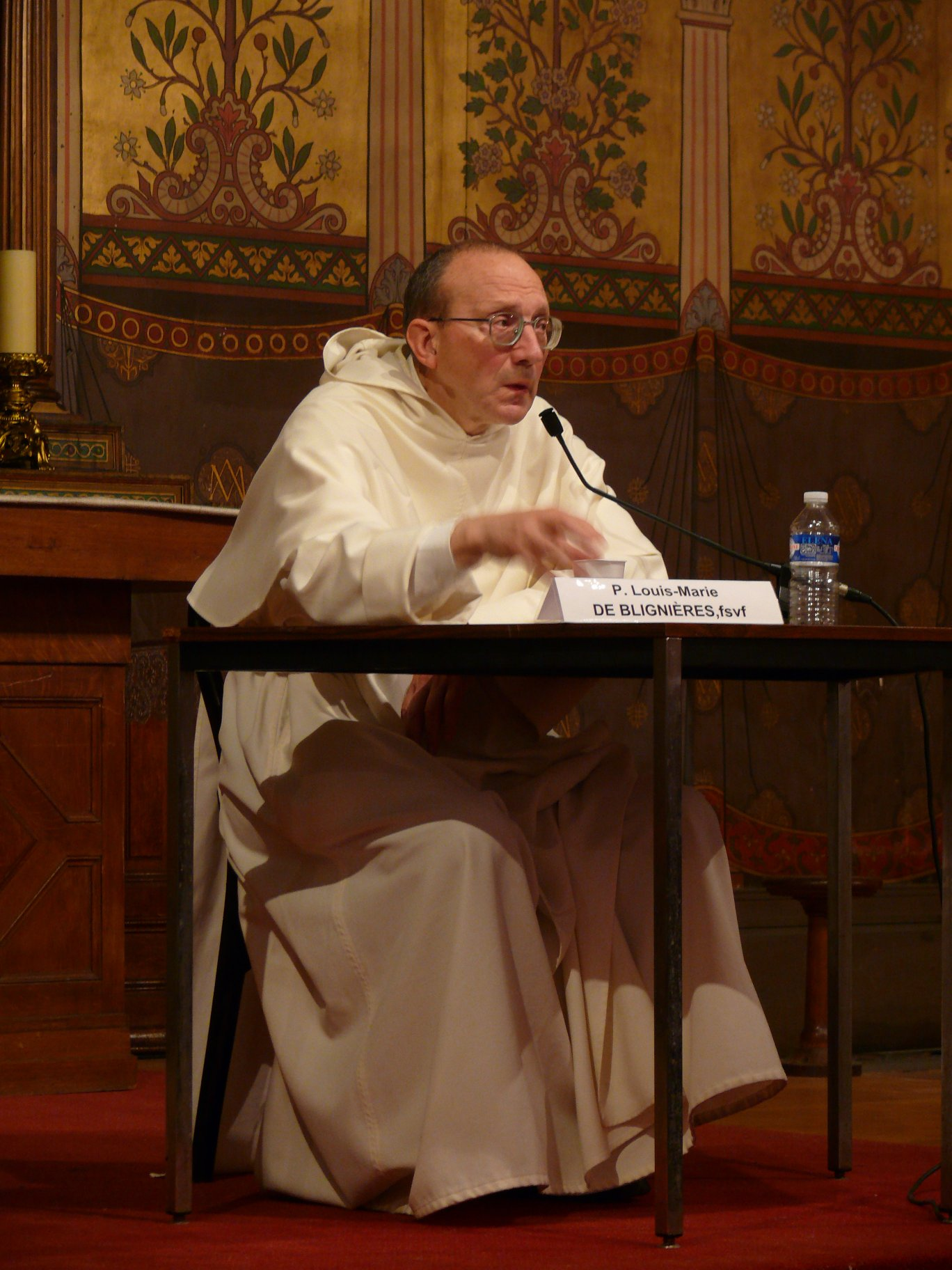
Father Louis-Marie de Blignières in 2014

The seat of the Fraternity is the monastery of Saint Thomas Aquinas in Chémeré-le-Roi, a village in north-west France between Laval and Le Mans.

== See also ==
- Ecclesia Dei
