= Religieuses Victimes du Sacré-Coeur de Jésus =

The Religieuses Victimes du Sacré-Coeur de Jésus are a monastic institute of diocesan right for women which follows the rule of St. Augustine. Fr. Jean du Sacré Coeur (Louis Marie Maulbon d'Arbaumont) wrote the religious constitutions which received papal approval on 19 December 1978.

The religious community was founded on 17 June 1838 in Marseille by Julie-Adèle de Gérin-Ricard, which took the religious name Mary of Jesus Crucified. She and three companions took their religious vows in September 1841. The sisters are wholly committed to a life of atonement and eternal adoration and celebrate the liturgy in the extraordinary form of the Roman Rite. The brown habit of the nuns bears a depiction of the Sacred Heart of Jesus on the scapular.

The community of about 20 nuns lives in papal enclosure and mainly from the products from their own agriculture. In September 2016 the convent sold their monastery in Marseille to Chavagnes-en-Paillers in order to find more quiet.
