= Pontifical Commission Ecclesia Dei =

Former Catholic commission for traditionalists

The Pontifical Commission Ecclesia Dei (Latin: Pontificia Commissio Ecclesia Dei) was a commission of the Catholic Church established by Pope John Paul II's motu proprio Ecclesia Dei of 2 July 1988 for the care of those former followers of Archbishop Marcel Lefebvre who broke with him as a result of his consecration of four priests of his Society of St. Pius X as bishops on 30 June 1988, an act that the Holy See deemed illicit and a schismatic act. It was also tasked with trying to return to full communion with the Holy See those traditionalist Catholics who are in a state of separation, of whom the Society of Saint Pius X (SSPX) is foremost, and of helping to satisfy just aspirations of people unconnected with these groups who want to keep alive the pre-1970 Roman Rite liturgy.

Pope Benedict XVI gave the commission additional functions on 7 July 2007, and on 8 July 2009 he made the Prefect of the Congregation for the Doctrine of the Faith the ex officio head of the commission. Pope Francis suppressed the commission and merged its responsibilities into the Congregation for the Doctrine of the Faith on 17 January 2019.

== History ==
=== 2000–2002 ===
According to Bernard Fellay, superior general of the Society of Saint Pius X, in 2000, Cardinal Darío Castrillón Hoyos, who became President of the Commission in that year, approached the bishops of the SSPX about regularizing relations, and told them that the Pope was prepared to grant them a personal prelature without territorial limits—the same canonical structure as that enjoyed by Opus Dei. According to William Dinges, it was the society that launched a petition drive calling for a personal prelature at least five years earlier.

The SSPX leadership required two preliminary "signs" before continuing negotiations: that the Holy See grant permission for all priests to celebrate the Tridentine Mass, and declare null its earlier declarations that the 1988 consecrations had resulted in excommunication.

Cardinal Castrillón refused to grant interviews on the matter, in order, as he said, "to maintain the privacy of the details of our dialogue". This silence was broken when his letter of 5 April 2002 to Bishop Bernard Fellay, Superior General of the SSPX, was later published. The letter contained the text of a protocol summarising the meeting between the two men held on 29 December 2000, a document that Bishop Fellay accepted at a further meeting the next day. The protocol envisaged a reconciliation on the basis of the protocol of 5 May 1988; the excommunications of 1988 would be lifted, rather than declared null. In his letter, the Cardinal proposed continuing negotiations with Bishop Fellay by means of personal meetings.

In keeping with Cardinal Castrillón's desire to avoid counterproductive publicity, the reports of the Ecclesia Dei Commission appearing in the annual publication L'Attività della Santa Sede (Libreria Editrice Vaticana) for the years 2000 and those immediately following make no mention of these negotiations.

In another field, the commission made successful contact in the same year 2000 with the Priestly Union of St Jean-Marie Vianney in Campos, Brazil, which was admitted to full communion with the Roman Catholic Church and was granted the status of a Personal Apostolic Administration within that diocese.

=== 2003–2005 ===
The 2003 report of the Ecclesia Dei Commission is the first of its 21st-century reports to speak of serious dialogue between SSPX and the Holy See:

During the year, dialogue about the canonical situation of the St Pius X Fraternity continued at various levels. In this connection, the Cardinal President had some high-level meetings and kept up an exchange of correspondence. On the Holy See's side, there has been no change in the effective proposals for regularizing the question. After examining the problems faced by priests and faithful, considering the good will of several members of the Fraternity and the recurrent problems of the faithful attached to the former liturgical tradition who take part in the Fraternity's liturgy, the full membership of the Commission studied and presented to the Holy Father a draft for restructuring the Commission with a view to... a possible return of the St Pius X Fraternity or of some of its members

The 2004 report had less to say about SSPX: "Again this year, dialogue at various levels continued, though slowly, with the Saint Pius X Fraternity. The Cardinal President had meetings, some at a high level, in this regard. On the Holy See's side, the effective proposals for regularizing the situation remain unaltered."

The 2005 report states: "During the year, the Cardinal President intensified dialogue with the Fraternity of St Pius X, finding that it had somewhat improved, with more concrete prospects of reaching more perfect communion. The Cardinal President had some meetings in this regard with His Excellency Bishop B. Fellay and other members in leadership positions, and kept up an exchange of correspondence."

Without having the meeting listed as one of his official audiences of the day, Pope Benedict XVI, the former Cardinal Joseph Ratzinger who in 1988 had in vain negotiated on behalf of Pope John Paul II with Archbishop Lefebvre, received for 35 minutes on 29 August 2005 Bishop Bernard Fellay, who had requested the meeting. There was no breakthrough, but statements from both sides spoke of the atmosphere as positive.

=== 2006–2008 ===
The commission marked another success in establishing on 8 September 2006 the Institute of the Good Shepherd with a membership of priests who had belonged to the Society of St Pius X.

Speaking on 16 May 2007 to the Fifth General Conference of the Bishops of Latin America and the Caribbean, Cardinal Castrillón presented the Ecclesia Dei Commission over which he presides as founded for the care of those "traditionalist Catholics" who, while discontented with the liturgical reform of the Second Vatican Council, had broken with Archbishop Marcel Lefebvre "because they disagreed with his schismatic action in ordaining Bishops without the required papal mandate". He added that at present the commission's activity is not limited to the service of those Catholics, nor to "the efforts undertaken to end the regrettable schismatic situation and secure the return of those brethren belonging to the Fraternity of Saint Pius X to full communion." It extends also, he said, to "satisfying the just aspirations of people, unrelated to the two aforementioned groups, who, because of their specific sensitiveness, wish to keep alive the earlier Latin liturgy in the celebration of the Eucharist and the other sacraments."

Pope Benedict XVI, he said, who was for years a member of the commission, wishes it to become an organ of the Holy See for the specific purpose of preserving and maintaining the value of the traditional Latin liturgy. He added the comment: "But it must be stated quite clearly that it is not a matter of going backward, of returning to the times before the 1970 reform. What is in question is instead a generous offer of the Vicar of Christ wishing, as an expression of his pastoral will, to place at the Church's disposal all the treasures of the Latin liturgy that for centuries nourished the spiritual life of so many generations of Catholic faithful. The Holy Father wishes to preserve the immense spiritual, cultural and esthetic treasure linked with the old liturgy. Recovery of these riches goes together with the no less precious riches of the Church's present liturgy."

Clearly, the Cardinal already knew the text of the motu proprio Summorum Pontificum, which Pope Benedict published on 7 July 2007, which gave the Pontifical Commission additional functions: it was to exercise the authority of the Holy See, supervising the observance and application of the dispositions of the motu proprio, and, if a bishop was unable to satisfy the request of a stable group of the kind mentioned, the matter was to be referred to the commission, either by the bishop himself or by others.

The dispositions of the motu proprio whose observance and application were thus entrusted to the Pontifical Commission included the following:

- Priests of the Latin Church can freely choose between the 1962 Roman Missal and the later edition "in Masses celebrated without the people". Such celebrations may be attended by those who spontaneously ask to be allowed.
- Where there is a "stable" group of faithful attached to the earlier form, the priest in charge of the church "should willingly accept their request to celebrate Mass according to the 1962 Missal", provided that the celebrating priest is "qualified to [celebrate] and not juridically impeded." (This would exclude traditionalist priests not in good standing with Rome.)
- "For faithful and priests who request it, the pastor should also allow celebrations in this extraordinary form for special circumstances such as marriages, funerals or occasional celebrations."
- "The pastor ... may also grant permission to use the earlier ritual for the administration of the Sacraments of Baptism, Marriage, Penance, and the Anointing of the Sick, if the good of souls would seem to require it."
- "Ordinaries are given the right to celebrate the Sacrament of Confirmation using the earlier Roman Pontifical, if the good of souls would seem to require it."
- "Clerics ... may use the Roman Breviary promulgated by Bl. John XXIII in 1962."

Some groups of traditionalist Catholics, such as the Sons of the Most Holy Redeemer (previously known as the Transalpine Redemptorists), that had been in dispute with the Holy See decided that this motu proprio gave grounds for seeking an agreement, contacted the commission and were received into full communion with the Holy See.

The commission also continued its conversations with the Society of St Pius X, which, though welcoming the motu proprio, referred to "difficulties that still remain", including "disputed doctrinal issues" and the notice of excommunication that still affects its bishops. After a meeting on 4 June 2008 with the society's superior general, Bishop Bernard Fellay, Cardinal Castrillón asked in writing to respond positively before the end of that month committing himself:

1. to give a response proportionate to the generosity of the pope.
2. to avoid any public intervention disrespectful of the person of the pope and that would be negative for ecclesial charity.
3. to avoid the claim to a magisterium higher than the Holy Father [Pope] and to not present the society in opposition to the Church.
4. to show the will to act honestly in full ecclesial charity and with respect for the authority of the Vicar of Christ.

Reuters reported on 26 June 2008 that Bishop Fellay had given a negative response.

=== 2009 ===
In his letter of 10 March 2009 concerning his remission, on 21 January 2009, of the excommunication of the four bishops of the Society of St Pius X, Pope Benedict XVI announced his intention to link the commission closely to the Congregation for the Doctrine of the Faith (CDF):

This will make it clear that the problems now to be addressed are essentially doctrinal in nature and concern primarily the acceptance of the Second Vatican Council and the post-conciliar magisterium of the Popes. The collegial bodies with which the Congregation studies questions which arise (especially the ordinary Wednesday meeting of Cardinals and the annual or biennial Plenary Session) ensure the involvement of the Prefects of the different Roman Congregations and representatives from the world's Bishops in the process of decision-making.

Pope Benedict put this into effect on 8 July 2009 by making the Prefect of the CDF, then Cardinal William Levada, the president of the commission, with responsibility for referring the commission's "principal cases and doctrinal questions" to the CDF's "ordinary procedures".

Concrete discussion of doctrinal problems, pending clarification of which "the Society has no canonical status in the Church and its ministers cannot legitimately exercise any ministry", began on 26 October 2009 with a meeting between experts on the two sides led on the part of the commission by its secretary, Monsignor Guido Pozzo, who has long been on the staff of the CDF and on the part of the society by Bishop Alfonso de Galarreta. Before the meeting, the society's superior general Bishop Bernard Fellay indicated that the discussions could require much time: “The issues are vast. Our principal objections to the Council, such as religious liberty, ecumenism and collegiality are well known. But other objections could be posed, such as the influence of modern philosophy, the liturgical novelties, the spirit of the world and its influence on the modern thought that holds sway in the Church." The subjects actually brought up in the meeting were the concept of tradition, the missal of Paul VI, the interpretation of the Second Vatican Council in line with the Church's doctrinal tradition, the themes of the unity of the Church and of Catholic principles on ecumenism, the relationship between Christianity and non-Christian religions, and freedom of religion.

Meetings were to continue at approximately two-month intervals. Accordingly, the second meeting was held on 18 January 2010, with no information given on its contents. Shortly before that second meeting, Bishop Richard Williamson, speaking in his own name, not on behalf of the society, said the talks are "a dialogue of the deaf".

=== 2011 ===
The commission's instruction Universae Ecclesiae, issued on 30 April 2011, the feast of Saint Pius V informed that it had been given authority to decide on appeals against administrative acts of ordinaries alleged to contravene the motu proprio Summorum Pontificum. It included specific norms on matters such as the function of diocesan bishops in monitoring liturgical matters in such a way as to ensure respect for the "extraordinary form" of the Roman Rite. It clarified that the "group of the faithful existing in a stable manner" who ask that the older form be celebrated need not predate Summorum Pontificum and need not be from the same parish, but they "must not in any way support or belong to groups which show themselves to be against the validity or legitimacy of the Holy Mass or the Sacraments celebrated in the forma ordinaria or against the Roman Pontiff as Supreme Pastor of the Universal Church." To celebrate in the older form of the Roman Rite, a priest must have enough knowledge of Latin to pronounce the words properly and understand them. Seminarians are to be offered assistance in acquiring the necessary knowledge of the language and, where pastoral needs suggest it, the manner of celebrating the older form.

=== 2012 ===
In January 2012 the Society of Saint Pius X delivered a substantive response to a document that the commission had presented to it in the previous September with a view to possible rehabilitation of the society and the granting to it of a canonical status within the Church. The document was believed to consist essentially in the profession of faith required of persons taking up offices in the Church and was to be published, if necessary in revised form, only later. The commission gave its response on 16 March 2012 and published a note that said: "In compliance with the decision by Pope Benedict XVI, the evaluation of the response of His Excellency Bishop Fellay was communicated to him by a letter delivered to him today. This evaluation notes that the position that he expressed is not sufficient to overcome the doctrinal problems that are at the basis of the rift between the Holy See and the aforesaid Society. At the conclusion of today's meeting, out of a concern for avoiding an ecclesial rupture with painful and incalculable consequences, the Superior General of the Society of Saint Pius X was invited to be so kind as to clarify his position so as to heal the existing rift, as Pope Benedict XVI wished." The society, which was reported to be deeply divided on the issue of acceptance or rejection, was given until 15 April 2012 to clarify its position.

On 17 April 2012 the response reached the Congregation for the Doctrine of the Faith, which studied it and submitted it to the judgement of Pope Benedict XVI. Another meeting between Levada and Fellay took place on 13 June 2012, at which the cardinal presented the Holy See's evaluation of the April response of the society and proposed a personal prelature as the most appropriate instrument for any future canonical recognition of the society. Bishop Fellay indicated that he could not sign the document of the Holy See's evaluation. In reply to an enquiry by Fellay whether the evaluation had been truly approved by the Pope, Benedict XVI sent him a hand-written letter assuring him that it was indeed his personal decision.

In July 2012, the society held a general chapter to consider the June communication from the Holy See and issued a declaration that "the Society continues to uphold the declarations and the teachings of the constant Magisterium of the Church in regard to all the novelties of the Second Vatican Council which remain tainted with errors, and also in regard to the reforms issued from it". The Holy See declared that it awaited an official response from the society. In an interview on 4 October 2012, the commission's new president Archbishop Gerhard Ludwig Müller remarked, with regard to the Holy See's demand that the society accept the decisions of the Second Vatican Council, including those on religious freedom and human rights: "In a pastoral sense, the door is always open"; he added: "We cannot put the Catholic faith at the mercy of negotiations. Compromise does not exist in this field. I think that there can now be no new discussions." On 27 October 2012, the commission stated that the society had indicated on 6 September 2012 that it needed more time to prepare its response to the Holy See's initiatives. The commission commented: "After thirty years of separation, it is understandable that time is needed to absorb the significance of these recent developments. As Our Holy Father Pope Benedict XVI seeks to foster and preserve the unity of the Church by realizing the long hoped-for reconciliation of the Priestly Fraternity of St. Pius X with the See of Peter – a dramatic manifestation of the munus Petrinum in action – patience, serenity, perseverance and trust are needed."

A December 2012 letter, in English and in French, from Archbishop Joseph Augustine Di Noia, vice-president of the Pontifical Commission "Ecclesia Dei", to all the members of the society indicated that the official reply of Bishop Fellay had not yet been received. Archbishop Di Noia lamented that some of the society's superiors "employ language, in unofficial communications, that to all the world appears to reject the very provisions, assumed to be still under study, that are required for the reconciliation and for the canonical regularization of the Fraternity within the Catholic Church". He added: "The only imaginable future for the Priestly Fraternity lies along the path of full communion with the Holy See, with the acceptance of an unqualified profession of the faith in its fullness, and thus with a properly ordered ecclesial, sacramental and pastoral life."

=== 2018 ===
The commission granted permission for some communities under its direction to use the liturgical forms for the services of Holy Week as they existed before the reforms of 1955 on an experimental basis for three years beginning in 2018.

=== Suppression (2019) ===
Pope Francis suppressed the commission and merged its responsibilities into the Congregation for the Doctrine of the Faith on 17 January 2019, and the Holy See Press Office published his decree on 19 January. He said that the outstanding issues were "of a doctrinal nature" and that a special within the CDF would take on the commission's responsibilities.

A Vatican source said Francis's action represented "a normalization of the ecclesiastical status of traditionalist communities in the Pius X ambit which many years ago were reconciled with the See of Peter, as well as those celebrating the extraordinary form". He characterized the suppression as a "mundane" reorganization that recognized how much the commission had achieved in establishing traditional communities within the Church.

== Commission presidents ==
- Paul Mayer, O.S.B. (2 July 1988 – 1 July 1991)
- Antonio Innocenti (1 July 1991 – 16 December 1995)
- Angelo Felici (16 December 1995 – 13 April 2000)
- Darío Castrillón Hoyos (14 April 2000 – 8 July 2009)
- William Joseph Levada (8 July 2009 – 2 July 2012)
- Gerhard Ludwig Müller (2 July 2012 – 1 July 2017)
- Luis Ladaria Ferrer (1 July 2017 – 17 January 2019)

== See also ==
- Preconciliar rites after the Second Vatican Council
