= Indult =

Concept in Catholic canon law

In Catholic canon law, an indult is a permission or privilege, granted by the competent church authority – the Holy See or the diocesan bishop, as the case may be – for an exception from a particular norm of church law in an individual case.

For example, according to the canons 692 and 693 of the 1983 Code of Canon Law, an indult is needed when members of the consecrated life want to be dispensed from their religious vows, or when priests and deacons voluntarily seek to return to the lay state (usually to marry).

A recent indult was the one granted in 1984 by Pope John Paul II, Quattuor abhinc annos, which authorised the world's Catholic bishops to permit celebrations of the Tridentine Mass liturgy in their dioceses. This indult was superseded in 2007 by new legislation introduced by Pope Benedict XVI in the motu proprio Summorum Pontificum, and superseded again in 2021 by Traditionis custodes.
