= Preconciliar rites after the Second Vatican Council =

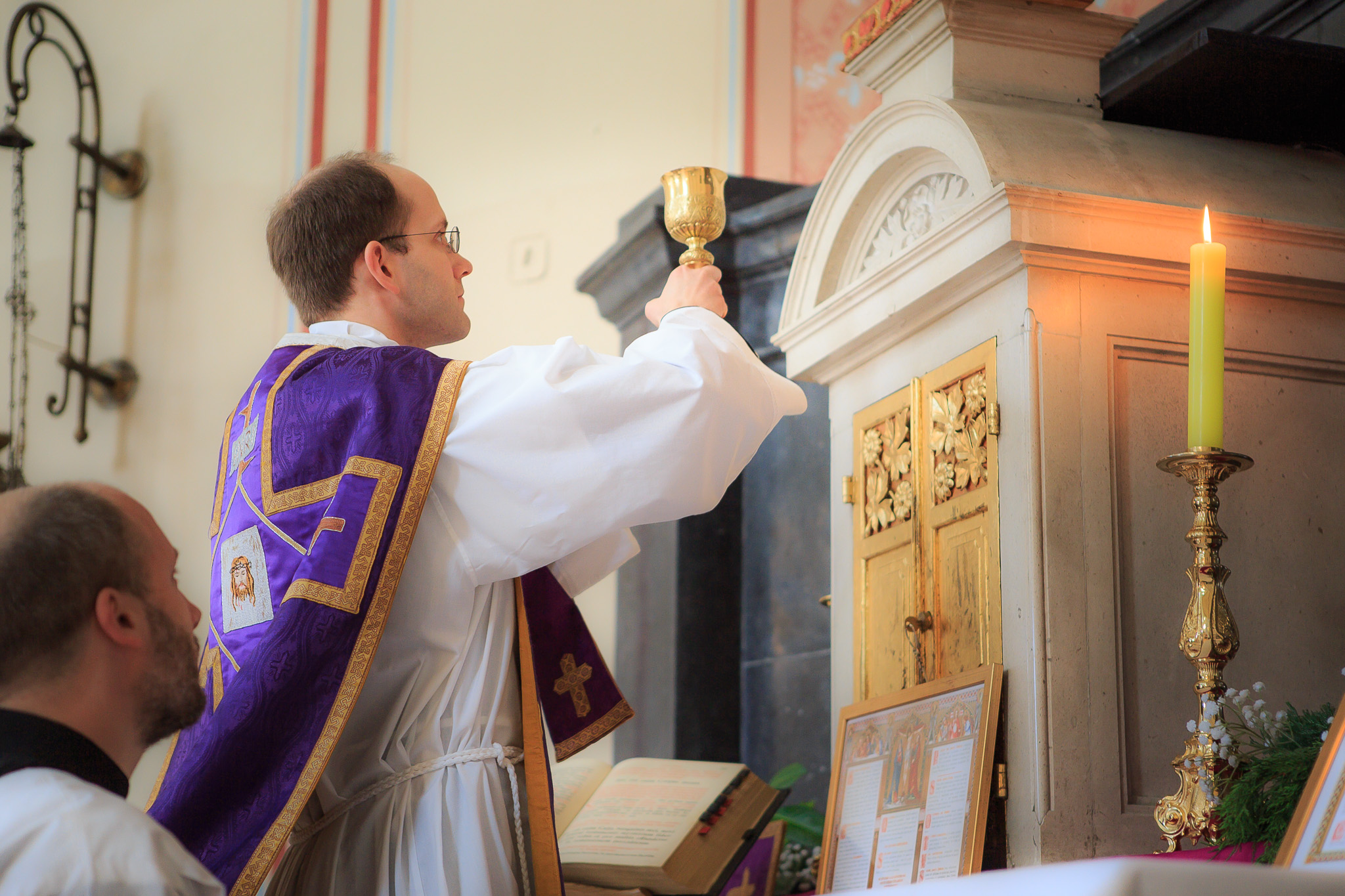
Mass celebrated according to the 1962 Roman Missal by a priest of the Priestly Fraternity of Saint Peter in 2017

In the Catholic Church, preconciliar Latin liturgical rites ("preconciliar": before the Second Vatican Council, which began in 1962) coexist with postconciliar rites. In the years following the Second Vatican Council, Pope Paul VI initiated significant changes to Catholic liturgical practices. Some of Paul VI's contemporaries, who considered the changes to be too drastic, obtained from him limited permission for the continued use of the previous Roman Missal. In the years since, the Holy See has granted varying degrees of permission to celebrate the Roman Rite and other Latin rites in the same manner as before the council. The use of preconciliar rites is associated with traditionalist Catholicism.

In the decades immediately after the Second Vatican Council, each of the various grants of permission to use the preconciliar Roman Rite Mass was in the form of an indult (i.e. a concession). The term universal indult was used to describe a hypothetical broadening of these concessionary permissions, but in his 2007 apostolic letter Summorum Pontificum, Pope Benedict XVI went even further than the proposed "universal indult" by elevating the status of the preconciliar forms beyond that of a concession. In 2021, Pope Francis reinstated restrictions on the use of the Tridentine Mass with his apostolic letter Traditionis custodes.

== Terminology ==
The simultaneous use of the preconciliar rites alongside the current editions of those same rites has necessitated the development of nomenclature to distinguish the older versions from the newer ones. The preconciliar Roman Rite has been called by a wide variety of names:

- Extraordinary Form (Latin: Forma extraordinaria)
- Usus antiquior
- Ancient Roman Rite
- Traditional Roman Rite
- Classical Roman Rite
- Tridentine Rite (Note: Although the name "Tridentine Rite" is sometimes used, it is not particularly accurate.)
- Gregorian Rite

To distinguish it from the Mass of Paul VI, the older Roman Rite Mass (that is, the 1962 revision of the Tridentine Mass) has been called at various times the:

- Indult Mass
- Tridentine Latin Mass or Traditional Latin Mass (both abbreviated as TLM), or simply the Latin Mass (Note: Not to be confused with the Mass of Paul VI in Latin.)
- Old Order of Mass (Latin: Vetus Ordo Missae) or simply the Vetus Ordo
- Preconciliar liturgy

The preconciliar Ambrosian Rite has been called the Extraordinary Form of the Ambrosian Rite.

Because the current versions of the rites are far more widely used, they are generally identified using the name of the rite without any further specification, e.g. "Ambrosian Rite". When differentiation is required, the current version is often called the Ordinary Form of the rite. Pope Francis introduced the phrase "unique expression" to refer to the current Roman Rite in contrast to the preconciliar form. The Mass of the current Roman Rite is sometimes called the New Order of Mass (Latin: Novus Ordo Missae) or simply the Novus Ordo.

== History ==
=== Indults of Paul VI ===
In June 1971, Pope Paul VI gave bishops permission to grant faculties to elderly or infirm priests to celebrate the older Roman Rite Mass without a congregation. Later that year, Cardinal John Heenan presented Paul VI with a petition signed by 57 scholars, intellectuals, and artists living in England, requesting permission to continue the use of the older Mass. On October 30, 1971, Paul VI granted this permission for England and Wales. Because Agatha Christie was one of the petition's 57 signers whose name Paul VI is said to have recognized, the indult became known as the Agatha Christie indult.

=== Quattuor abhinc annos (1984) ===
In the 1984 letter Quattuor abhinc annos, the Congregation for Divine Worship and the Discipline of the Sacraments under Pope John Paul II extended to the entire Latin Church the indult for bishops to authorize celebrations of the preconciliar Roman Rite Mass under certain conditions.

=== Ecclesia Dei (1988) ===
In 1988, in the context of the Écône consecrations and the resulting schism, Pope John Paul II issued motu proprio the apostolic letter Ecclesia Dei in which he urged a "wide and generous application" of the indult already given. Masses celebrated under the Ecclesia Dei framework came to be known as "Indult Masses."

John Paul II simultaneously created the Pontifical Commission Ecclesia Dei to supervise groups using the preconciliar liturgy. Days after the letter's promulgation, John Paul II instituted the Priestly Fraternity of Saint Peter to minister in the preconciliar Roman Rite exclusively.

=== Summorum Pontificum (2007) ===
In 2007, Pope Benedict XVI issued motu proprio the apostolic letter Summorum Pontificum in which he introduced the terminology of "extraordinary form" to describe the preconciliar liturgy. Rather than using the language of concession or permission, Benedict established the preconciliar form as parallel to the postconciliar, albeit as "extraordinary" in the sense of "different". Instead of giving bishops control over the extent of preconciliar celebrations, Benedict XVI required priests with the suitable liturgical competency to offer the preconciliar rites to "stable groups of the faithful" who requested them. Benedict also authorized the use of the older rite for the celebration of sacraments (beyond the celebration of Mass) and allowed clerics to fulfill their obligation of prayer using the Roman Breviary in lieu of the postconciliar Liturgy of the Hours. He furthermore permitted the celebration of other preconciliar Latin rites besides the Roman Rite.

The publication of Summorum Pontificum has led to an increase in the number of regularly scheduled public Tridentine Masses. On 14 June 2008, Cardinal Darío Castrillón Hoyos told a London press conference that Pope Benedict wanted every parish to offer both the old and the new forms for Sunday Mass.

On March 25, 2020 the Congregation for the Doctrine of the Faith issued two decrees giving new Eucharistic prefaces and provision for the optional celebration of more recent saints in the Tridentine form. The decree Quo magis provides seven new Eucharistic prefaces for the extraordinary form of the Mass, which may be used for particular occasions, such as votive Masses or the feast days of saints. The second decree, Cum sanctissima, establishes a provision for the celebration of the third class feasts of saints canonized after July 1960, whose memorials were established after the 1962 Roman Missal. Cum sanctissima includes a list of 70 third class feasts, equivalent to a memorial in the ordinary form.

=== Traditionis custodes (2021) ===
In 2021, Pope Francis, motivated by a desire to stave off what he perceived to be growing rejection of the Second Vatican Council developing from groups using the preconciliar rites, issued motu proprio the apostolic letter Traditionis custodes to restore the previous status quo of bishops having authority over the celebrations of Mass in the preconciliar Roman Rite. Francis stated in the letter that the current version of the Roman Rite (i.e., that which has been reformed after the Vatican II council) ought to be regarded as the "unique expression of [its] lex orandi."

== Liturgies ==
=== Mass ===
Most groups exercising the preconciliar Roman Rite celebrate the Tridentine Mass according to the 1962 typical edition of the Roman Missal.

=== Divine Office ===
In his 2007 letter Summorum Pontificum, Pope Benedict XVI permitted priests to fulfill their canonical obligation of prayer (their "divine office") using the preconciliar Roman Breviary instead of the postconciliar Liturgy of the Hours.

=== Sacraments ===
Pope Benedict XVI in Summorum Pontificum also authorized the celebration of other sacraments according to the preconciliar rites. In 2021, the Congregation for Divine Worship and the Discipline of the Sacraments promulgated a responsa ad dubia, in light of Traditionis custodes. In it, it placed restrictions on use of the Rituale Romanum and a total ban on use of the Pontificale Romanum. However in February 2022, Pope Francis confirmed that the Priestly Fraternity of Saint Peter were exempt from these restrictions.

== Current use within the Catholic Church ==
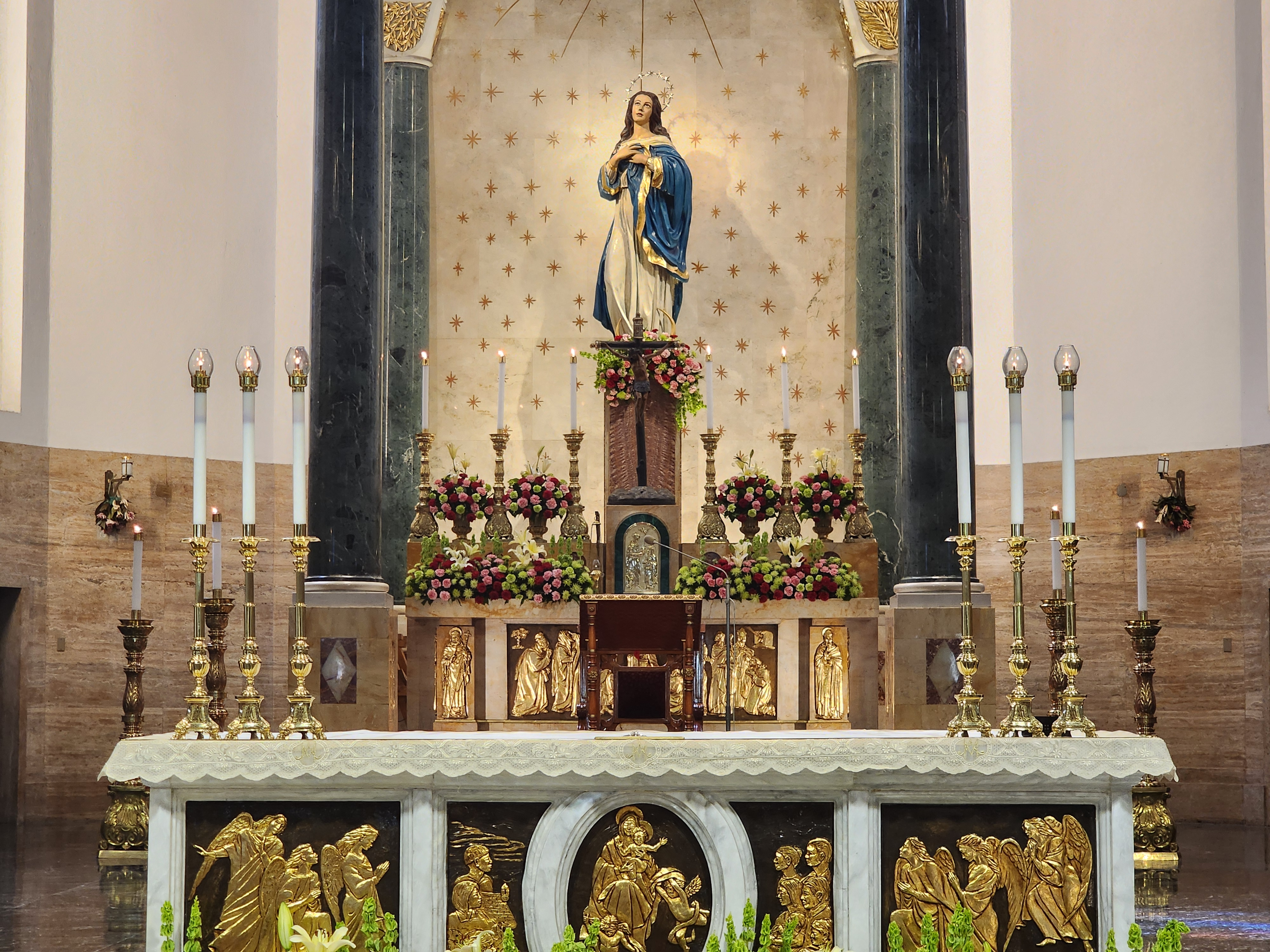
The preconciliar (background) and postconciliar (foreground) altars of the Manila Cathedral.

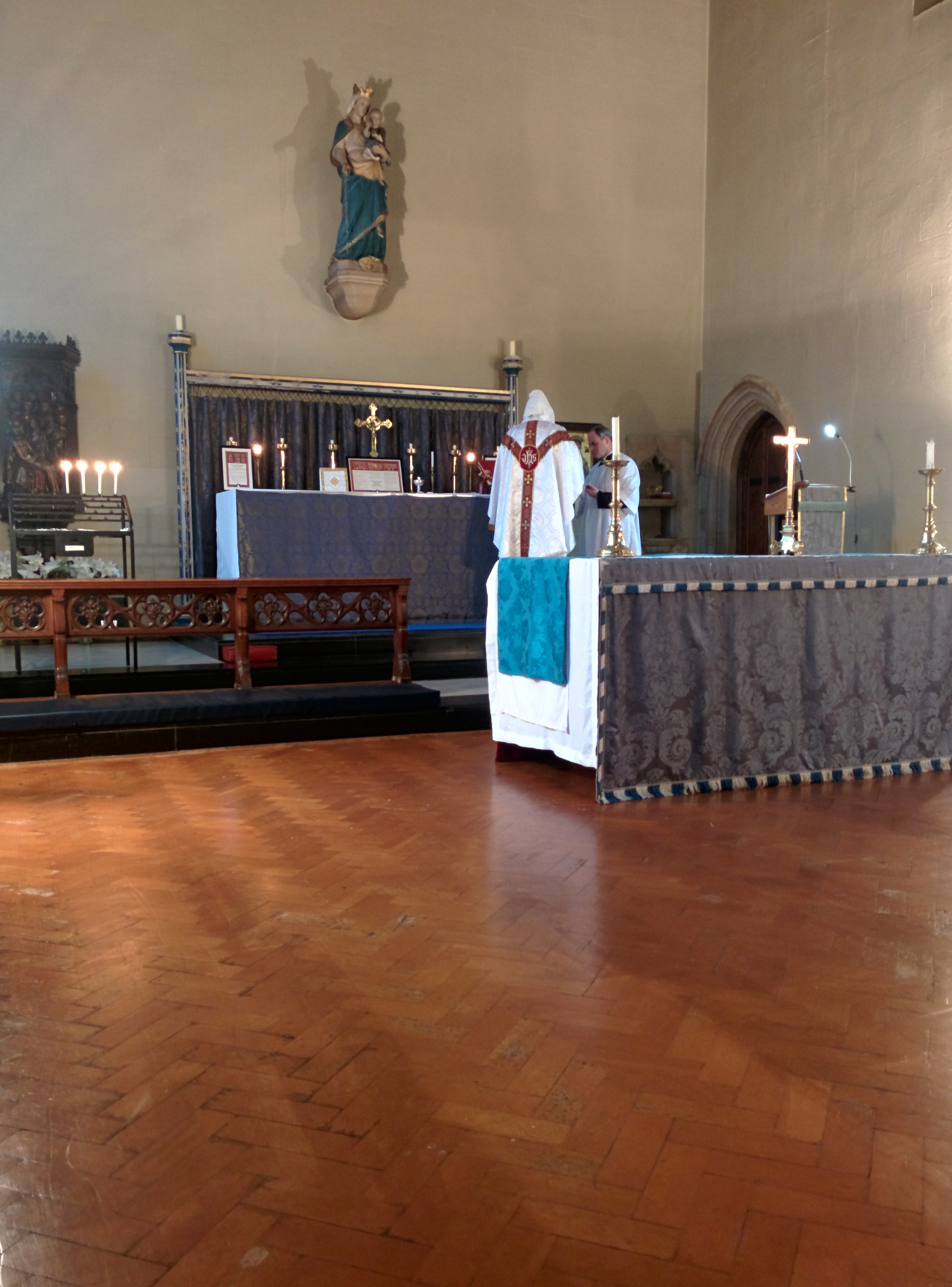
A celebration of the preconciliar Dominican Rite Mass at Holy Cross Priory, Leicester, United Kingdom

=== Dioceses ===
The number of preconciliar Roman Rite Masses celebrated by diocesan clergy grew significantly after the release of Summorum Pontificum. Many bishops, however, curtailed diocesan preconciliar Masses after the promulgation of Traditionis custodes.

=== Personal apostolic administration ===
A unique jurisdiction is the Personal Apostolic Administration of Saint John Mary Vianney, a canonical structure erected by Pope John Paul II in 2002, geographically coterminous with the Diocese of Campos in Brazil, and dedicated to exclusively ministering in the preconciliar Roman Rite.

=== Institutes and societies ===
Some institutes of consecrated life and societies of apostolic life in the Catholic Church use preconciliar liturgical forms exclusively, including those of the Roman Rite, Carmelite Rite, Dominican Rite, and Premonstratensian Rite.

=== Canonically irregular clergy ===
The Society of Saint Pius X, a group of traditionalist clergy, grew out of resistance to the postconciliar liturgical changes, and continues to use the preconciliar Roman Rite exclusively. The society is "canonically irregular," meaning they operate outside of the canonical structures governed by the pope, even though they acknowledge the pope as legitimate.

=== Demography ===
In December 2021, Catholic News Agency estimated that there were 60,000 Traditionalist Catholics in France, representing 4% to 7% of all practicing Catholics in the country, and a sizable number of these Traditionalist Catholics are with schismatic groups which are not in full communion with the Holy See. These groups "show slow but steady growth each year" and tend to have younger-than-average churchgoers.

It was also estimated that 150,000 Catholics regularly attend the Tridentine Mass in the US, representing less than 1% of the 21 million Catholics regularly attending Mass throughout the US.

== Current use outside the Catholic Church ==
The scope of the liturgical changes after the Second Vatican Council was one factor that led certain groups identifying as traditionalist Catholics to claim that the postconciliar popes have been incapable of holding the office of the papacy ("sedevacantism") or incapable of legitimately exercising its functions ("sedeprivationism"). Conclavist groups are those who have claimed to elect their own successor to the papacy. These groups generally use the preconciliar Roman Rite.

== Promotional organizations ==
=== Societies ===
Lay-led groups dedicated to the promotion of preconciliar rites and practices are often called "Latin Mass societies".

=== Periodicals ===
- Latin Mass Magazine
- Usus Antiquior (2010–2012)
