= Chémeré-le-Roi =

- Commune
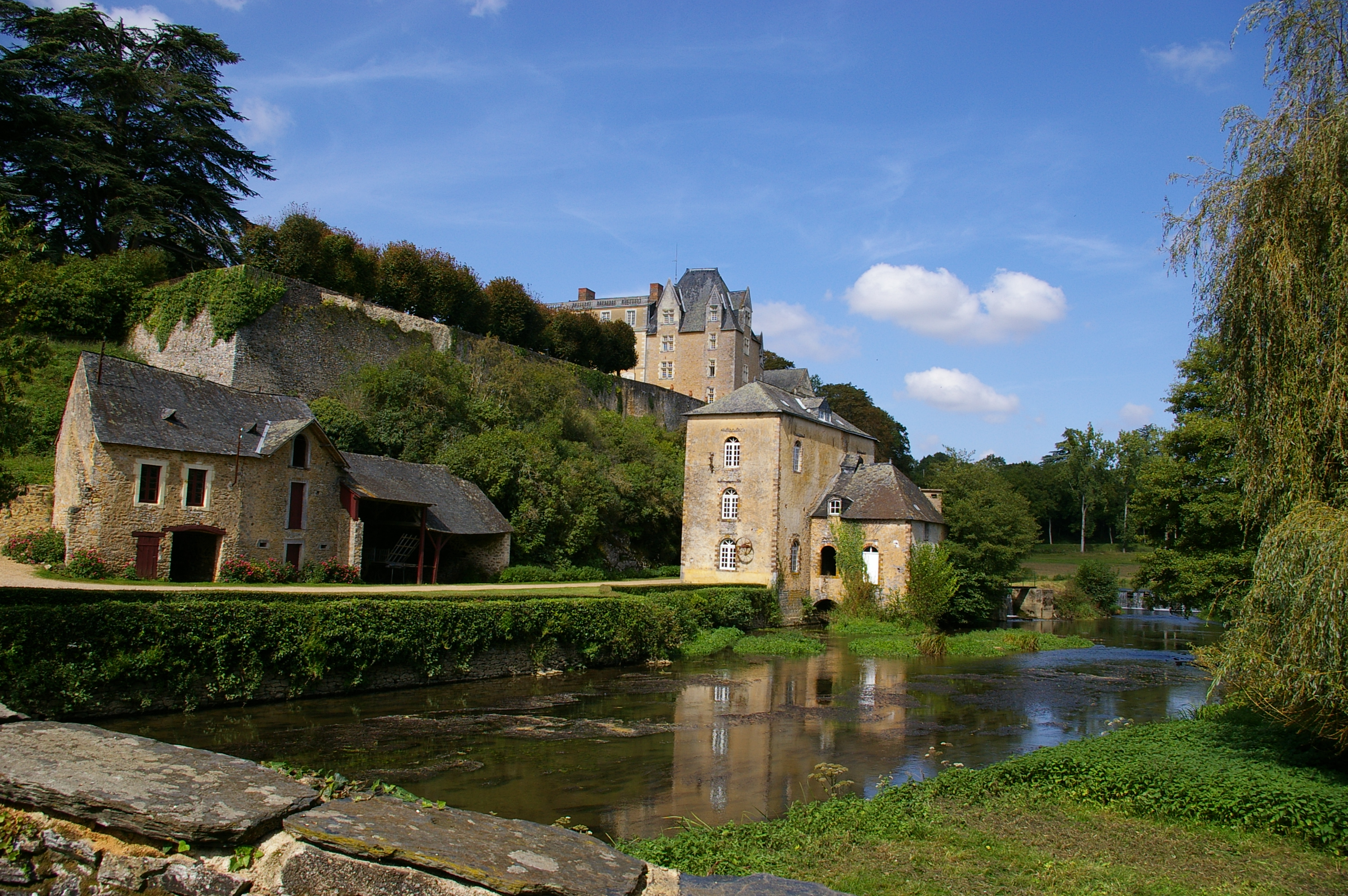
- The watermill and the Château de Thévalles, in Chémeré-le-Roi
- Location of Chémeré-le-Roi
- Location within France Location within Pays de la Loire
- Coordinates: 47°58′41″N 0°25′59″W
- Country: France
- Region: Pays de la Loire
- Department: Mayenne
- Arrondissement: Château-Gontier
- Canton: Meslay-du-Maine

Government
  - Mayor (2020–2026): Jean-Luc Landelle
- Area^{1}: 15.18 km^{2} (5.86 sq mi)
- Highest elevation: 111 m (364 ft)
- Lowest elevation: 47 m (154 ft)
- Population (2023): 431
  - Density: 28.4/km^{2} (73.5/sq mi)
- Time zone: UTC+01:00 (CET)
  - Summer (DST): UTC+02:00 (CEST)
- INSEE/Postal code: 53067 /53340
- ^{1} French Land Register data, which excludes lakes, ponds, glaciers > 1 km^{2} (0.386 sq mi or 247 acres) and river estuaries.

Chémeré-le-Roi (French pronunciation: [ʃɛmʁe lə ʁwa]) is a commune in the Mayenne department in north-western France.

== See also ==
- Communes of the Mayenne department
