= Ecclesia Dei =

Papal motu proprio condemning the Ecône consecrations

Ecclesia Dei Latin for 'The Church of God' Motu proprio of Pope John Paul II
- Signature date: 2 July 1988
- Subject: 1988 Écône consecrations
- Text: In Latin; In English

Ecclesia Dei is the document Pope John Paul II issued on 2 July 1988 in reaction to the 1988 Écône consecrations, in which four priests of the Society of Saint Pius X were ordained as bishops despite an express prohibition by the Holy See. The consecrating bishop and the four priests consecrated were excommunicated. John Paul called for unity and established the Pontifical Commission Ecclesia Dei to foster a dialogue with those associated with the consecrations who hoped to maintain both loyalty to the papacy and their attachment to traditional liturgical forms.

As is customary for such a papal document, it takes its name from the opening words of its Latin text, Ecclesia Dei, meaning "God's Church".

Ecclesia Dei is also the name of an Italian Traditionalist weekly published by the Society of Saint Pius X and later founded in the 1990s.

== Excommunications of those involved ==
The SSPX is an association of priests that Marcel Lefebvre founded in 1970. Its members distrusted the changes then taking place in the Church in the years following the Second Vatican Council.

On 30 June 1988, Archbishop Marcel Lefebvre and Bishop Antônio de Castro Mayer consecrated four priests as bishops at the seminary of the Society of St. Pius X (SSPX) in Écône, Switzerland. Referring to these consecrations, the Pope wrote in Ecclesia Dei:

"In itself, this act was one of disobedience to the Roman Pontiff in a very grave matter and of supreme importance for the unity of the Church, such as is the ordination of bishops whereby the apostolic succession is sacramentally perpetuated. Hence such disobedience – which implies in practice the rejection of the Roman primacy – constitutes a schismatic act (cf. Code of Canon Law, can. 751). In performing such an act, notwithstanding the formal canonical warning sent to them by the Cardinal Prefect of the Congregation for Bishops on 17 June last, Mons. Lefebvre and the priests Bernard Fellay, Bernard Tissier de Mallerais, Richard Williamson and Alfonso de Galarreta have incurred the grave penalty of excommunication envisaged by ecclesiastical law (cf. Code of Canon Law, can. 1382)."

According to the 1983 Code of Canon Law, can. 1382: "A bishop who consecrates some one a bishop without a pontifical mandate and the person who receives the consecration from him incur a latae sententiae excommunication reserved to the Apostolic See" (the phrase latae sententiae means automatically by force of the law itself, at the very moment a law is broken). The reservation indicates that only the Pope can lift it.

Pope John Paul II went on to make

"an appeal both solemn and heartfelt, paternal and fraternal, to all those who until now have been linked in various ways to the movement of Archbishop Lefebvre, that they may fulfil the grave duty of remaining united to the Vicar of Christ in the unity of the Catholic Church, and of ceasing their support in any way for that movement. Everyone should be aware that formal adherence to the schism is a grave offence against God and carries the penalty of excommunication decreed by the Church's law (cf. Code of Canon Law, can. 1364)."

Canon 1364 specifies that the same excommunication latae sententiae excommunication applies to an apostate, a heretic, or a schismatic.

== Pontifical Commission ==
The Pope instituted the Pontifical Commission Ecclesia Dei to assist those who had been associated with Archbishop Lefebvre but who wished "to remain united to the Successor of Peter in the Catholic Church, while preserving their spiritual and liturgical traditions, in the light of the Protocol signed on 5 May last by Cardinal Ratzinger and Mons. Lefebvre", a protocol that Archbishop Lefebvre later repudiated.

== Use of the Tridentine Mass ==
The Pope stated: "Respect must everywhere be shown for the feelings of all those who are attached to the Latin liturgical tradition, by a wide and generous application of the directives already issued some time ago by the Apostolic See for the use of the Roman Missal according to the typical edition of 1962". In this, the Pope expanded the scope of permission already granted under the 1984 special indult Quattuor Abhinc Annos.

=== Further regulations ===
The conditions indicated in the document to which Pope John Paul referred were replaced on 7 July 2007 by those indicated in the motu proprio Summorum Pontificum, which Pope Francis in turn replaced with the far more restrictive Traditionis Custodes.

Pope Benedict XVI gave the Commission additional functions with respect to the use of Tridentine liturgy in Summorum Pontificum on 7 July 2007. On 8 July 2009, in Ecclesiae unitatem, he modified its position within the Roman Curia by making the Prefect of the Congregation for the Doctrine of the Faith (CDF) the ex officio head of the Commission. On 17 January 2019, Pope Francis abolished the Commission and transferred its responsibilities to a "special section" within the CDF.

== See also ==
- Preconciliar rites after the Second Vatican Council
- Marcel Lefebvre
- Quattuor abhinc annos
- Society of Saint Pius X
- Tridentine Mass
