= Carlo Maria Viganò =

Italian traditionalist Catholic archbishop (born 1941)

- Former Apostolic Nuncio to the United States
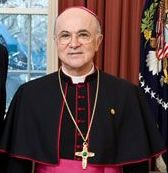
- Viganò in 2013
- Church: Catholic Church (Excommunicated)
- Appointed: 19 October 2011
- Retired: 12 April 2016
- Predecessor: Pietro Sambi
- Successor: Christophe Pierre
- Other post: Titular Archbishop of Ulpiana (1992–2024; deposed)
- Previous posts: Secretary-General of the Governorate of the Vatican City State (2009‍–‍2011); Official of Secretariat of State (1998‍–‍2009); Apostolic Nuncio to Nigeria (1992‍–‍1998); Permanent Observer of the Holy See to the Council of Europe (1989‍–‍1992)

Orders
- Ordination: 24 March 1968 by Carlo Allorio
- Consecration: 26 April 1992 by Pope John Paul II

Personal details
- Born: Carlo Maria Viganò; 16 January 1941 (age 85) Varese, Kingdom of Italy
- Education: Pontifical Gregorian University (JUD)
- Motto: Scio cui credidi (Latin for 'I know Him in whom I have believed')
- Coat of arms: Carlo Maria Viganò's coat of arms

Ordination history
History
Priestly ordination
- Ordained by: Carlo Allorio
- Date: 24 March 1968
Episcopal consecration
- Principal consecrator: Pope John Paul II
- Co-consecrators: Franciszek Macharski, Angelo Sodano
Episcopal succession
Bishops consecrated by Carlo Maria Viganò as principal consecrator
- Anthony J.V. Obinna: 1993
- Gabriel Abegunrin: 1995
- Martin Uzoukwu: 1996
- Alfred Martins: 1998
Official Links
- Exsurge Domine Foundation (Homilies and Writings of Archbishop Vigano)
- X.com/CarloMVigano
Styles
- Reference style: His Excellency; The Most Reverend
- Spoken style: Your Excellency
- Religious style: Archbishop

Carlo Maria Viganò (Italian pronunciation: [vigaˈnɔ]; born 16 January 1941) is an Italian excommunicated archbishop who served as Apostolic Nuncio to the United States from 2011 to 2016 and as secretary-general of the Governorate of Vatican City State from 2009 to 2011. He is known for having publicized the Vatican leaks scandal of 2012, in which he revealed financial corruption in the Vatican, and a 2018 letter accusing Pope Francis and other Catholic leaders of covering up sexual abuse allegations against former cardinal Theodore McCarrick. In 2024, after stating his intention to create a traditionalist seminary outside of the Church's control, Viganò was charged by the Vatican with schism. He was declared guilty and excommunicated.

Viganò was ordained a priest in 1968 and spent most of his career working in a diplomatic capacity for the Holy See. As a priest, he served on a number of diplomatic missions before being consecrated a bishop by Pope John Paul II in 1992. After becoming a bishop, Viganò continued his diplomatic career, spending six years as nuncio in Nigeria before being transferred to Rome. Viganò was appointed secretary general of the Vatican City Governorate in 2009, where he reformed the finances of Vatican City and turned a budget deficit into a surplus. He complained directly to Pope Benedict XVI about financial corruption. The unauthorized publication of two of his letters led to the Vatican leaks scandal, exposing financial mismanagement and wrongdoing in the Vatican. He was then transferred to the position of apostolic nuncio to the United States in 2011 over his objections. While in the United States, Viganò earned a reputation as a conservative, arranging a controversial meeting between Pope Francis and former county clerk Kim Davis, known for her opposition to same-sex marriage, during the Pope's 2015 visit to the United States. A priest accused him of suppressing allegations of sexual misconduct against Archbishop John Clayton Nienstedt, but he denied doing so. Viganò's term as ambassador ended in 2016.

In August 2018, Viganò published an 11-page letter accusing Pope Francis and numerous other senior church leaders of concealing allegations of sexual misconduct against McCarrick. Viganò stated that Pope Benedict XVI imposed sanctions on McCarrick in response to accusations that were made against him, but that Pope Francis refused to enforce them and that he made McCarrick an important advisor. Viganò called on Francis to resign. The letter provoked diverse reactions within the church, with some expressing support for the allegations and calling for further investigation, and some defending Francis, questioning the statements made in the letter and Viganò's credibility.

After the publication of the letter, Viganò continued to issue controversial public statements and conspiracy theories. He has rejected the Second Vatican Council and the Mass of Paul VI; in December 2023, he announced plans to establish a traditionalist seminary outside of the church's jurisdiction. In 2024, he was charged with schism and, after refusing to appear at a trial, excommunicated.

== Early life and career ==
Carlo Maria Viganò was born on 16 January 1941 in Varese, Kingdom of Italy. He was ordained a priest on 24 March 1968 by Bishop Carlo Allorio. He earned a doctorate in utroque iure (both canon and civil law).

His nephew Carlo Maria Polvani is a priest and adjunct under-secretary at the Pontifical Council for Culture.

== Diplomatic career ==
On 3 April 1992, Viganò was appointed Titular Archbishop of Ulpiana and Apostolic Pro-Nuncio to Nigeria by Pope John Paul II.

At the close of his mission to Nigeria in 1998, he was assigned to functions within the Secretariat of State as delegate for Pontifical Representations, making him the personnel chief for the Roman curia in addition to Vatican diplomats. He served in this role until he became secretary general of the governatorate on 16 July 2009.

=== Secretary General of the Vatican City Governorate ===
In 2009, Viganò was appointed secretary general of the Vatican City Governorate. In that role he established centralized accounting procedures and accountability for cost overruns that reportedly helped turn a US$10.5 million deficit for the city-state into a surplus of $44 million in one year.

In 2010, Viganò suggested that the Vatican should drop out of the Euro currency agreement in order to avoid new European banking regulations. Instead, the Vatican chose to adhere to the Euro agreement and accept the new scrutiny that tougher banking regulations required. In late January 2012, a television program aired in Italy under the name of Gli intoccabili (The Untouchables), purporting to disclose confidential letters and memos of the Vatican. Among the documents were letters written to the pope and to the Secretary of State, Cardinal Tarcisio Bertone, by Viganò, complaining of corruption in Vatican finances and a campaign of defamation against him. Viganò, formerly the second-ranked Vatican administrator to the Pope, requested not to be transferred for having exposed alleged corruption that cost the Holy See millions in higher contract prices.

On 4 February 2012, Giovanni Lajolo, Giuseppe Bertello, Giuseppe Sciacca, and Giorgio Corbellini issued a joint statement on behalf of the Governorate of the Vatican: "The unauthorized publication of two letters of Archbishop Carlo Maria Viganò, the first addressed to the Holy Father on March 27, 2011, the second to the Cardinal Secretary of State on May 8, for the Governorate of Vatican City is a source of great bitterness. The allegations contained in them can not but lead to the impression that the Governorate of Vatican City, instead of being an instrument of responsible government, is an unreliable entity, at the mercy of dark forces. After careful examination of the contents of the two letters, the President of the Governorate sees it as its duty to publicly declare that those assertions are the result of erroneous assessments, or fears based on unsubstantiated evidence, even openly contradicted by the main characters invoked as witnesses."

Velasio De Paolis, former head of the Vatican's Prefecture of the Economic Affairs, its auditing office, said, "From what I know, I don't think there was actual corruption." But he did concede the possibility of "instances of a lack of correctness".

Journalist John L. Allen Jr. suggests that Viganò's transfer could have been about a clash of personalities rather than policy. "[T]his would not seem to be about a courageous whistle-blower who's trying to expose wrongdoing or prompt reform. The motives seem more personal and political."

=== Apostolic Nuncio to the United States ===
==== Appointment and handling of sexual abuse allegations ====
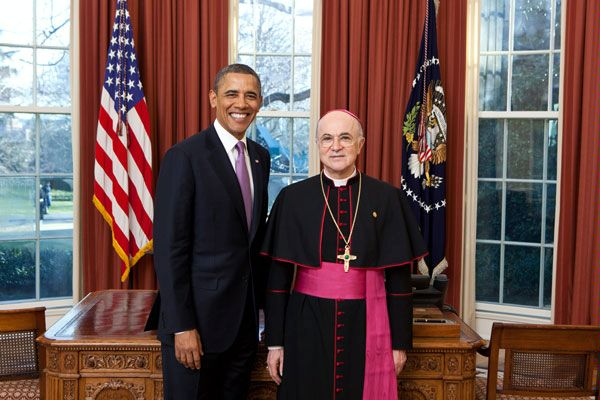
Viganò with U.S. President Barack Obama, 2013

On 13 August 2011, Bertone informed Viganò that Pope Benedict was appointing him nuncio to the United States. Reuters reported that Viganò was unwilling to take that assignment. Viganò stated that this decision was not what Pope Benedict XVI originally had manifested to him. He wrote to Benedict that his appointment would create "disarray and discouragement" among those who worked against "numerous situations of corruption and waste". One of the letters leaked by Benedict's butler in 2012 revealed that Viganò had bypassed Bertone and complained directly to Benedict regarding corruption in the Vatican, for which Bertone arranged to have Viganò transferred to Washington over Viganò's objections. Although Federico Lombardi, the official Vatican spokesperson, had originally said that Benedict held "unquestionable faith and trust" in Viganò, a statement in February 2012 signed by some Vatican leaders said that his allegations were "erroneous," "unfounded," and "based on groundless fears."

It was initially reported that Viganò's brother, Lorenzo Viganò, a Jesuit biblical scholar, had said that his brother lied in telling Benedict he needed to stay in Rome to care for his ailing brother, when apparently Lorenzo was healthy, living in Chicago, and had not spoken to his brother for two years. However, Viganò's siblings disputed those statements. The Vatican published Viganò's Washington appointment on 19 October 2011 and Viganò became the 14th papal representative to the United States since the creation of the post in 1893 and the fifth to serve as a diplomatic representative accredited to the government since bilateral diplomatic relations were established in 1984. Viganò said he welcomed the appointment and said that being Apostolic Nuncio to the United States is an "important, vast and delicate" task; he was grateful to Pope Benedict for entrusting him with the mission and he felt called to renew his "trust in the Lord, who asks me to set out again." Being apostolic nuncio, he said, is "a call to know this people, this country and come to love them."

Cardinal Timothy Dolan, Archbishop of New York, commented that the revelation of Viganò's complaints about corruption and cronyism in Vatican finances "in a way...enhances his credibility as someone who does not look upon the internal workings of the Holy See with rose-colored glasses, but is well aware of difficulties there."

In 2014, Viganò allegedly ordered officials of the Archdiocese of St. Paul and Minneapolis to end an investigation into sexual misconduct on the part of Archbishop John Nienstedt, who was found innocent by police authorities. Dan Griffith, who served as the archdiocese's Delegate for Safe Environment between August 2013 and July 2014, wrote an account of a meeting that took place in April 2014. Griffith's memo was leaked to the National Catholic Reporter in July 2016 and alleged that Viganò had ordered the archdiocese's two auxiliary bishops, Lee A. Piché and Andrew H. Cozzens, to cease the investigation and carry out the destruction of evidence. On 11 March 2014, local county officials announced they had concluded an intensive investigation and would not file charges against Nienstedt, who announced his return to public ministry the same day. However, Nienstedt resigned in June 2015 after it was announced that a Minnesota prosecutor was bringing criminal charges and initiating a civil suit against the archdiocese for failing to protect children from sexual abuse. After the Nienstedt case received renewed attention following Viganò's 2018 letter, Viganò denied allegations that he had attempted to suppress the investigation and provided documentation in his defense. Griffith responded to Viganò's statement and defended his memo. Cozzens also responded with a statement stating that at one point he and Griffith believed that Viganò had ordered an end to the investigation, but that Viganò later clarified that the investigation should be completed. Cozzens said that he believed Griffith acted in good faith.

On 5 June 2019, Viganò was reported to have received, together with other influential U.S. Catholic leaders, substantial monetary gifts from West Virginia bishop Michael J. Bransfield, who had resigned following allegations of sexual misconduct. The gifts had been reimbursed by Bransfield's diocese. Viganò said that he had been told by his staff that such gifts were common in the United States, that he had decided to donate the money to charity, and that he did not know that the diocese had reimbursed Bransfield.

==== Kim Davis meeting ====
On 24 September 2015 during his visit to the United States, Pope Francis met Kim Davis, the Kentucky clerk who refused to issue marriage licenses to same-sex couples. On 2 October, Thomas Rosica, a Vatican spokesman, said that the office of Viganò had extended the invitation to Davis. Chief Vatican spokesman Federico Lombardi depicted the meeting as one among many brief introductions rather than an audience.

Juan Carlo Cruz, a survivor of sexual abuse who met with Pope Francis, alleged that Viganò "nearly sabotaged the visit" by having Francis meet Davis. "I didn't know who that woman was, and he snuck her in to say hello to me — and of course they made a whole publicity out of it," Pope Francis said, according to Cruz. Cruz stated that Pope Francis said that he was "horrified" and that he then "fired that nuncio." Viganò replied by releasing a letter to LifeSiteNews, stating that "the pope knew very well who Davis was, and he and his close collaborators had provided the private audience." Subsequently, Vatican spokesman Lombardi and Thomas Rosica confirmed that, the evening prior to Francis's meeting with Davis, Viganò had indeed spoken "with the pope and his collaborators and received a consensus" regarding the meeting. Shortly after the meeting, Cardinal Donald Wuerl of Washington informed a reporter that both he and Archbishop Joseph Kurtz, then-president of the U.S. Conference of Catholic Bishops, had advised Viganò against arranging the meeting. Lombardi stated that Viganò had organized the meeting and "inserted it in the context of the pope's many and quick greetings at his departure from the nunciature," which "certainly did not allow the pope and his collaborators to realize the significance of this meeting."

=== Retirement ===
In January 2016, Viganò submitted his resignation from the position of Nuncio as required when he turned 75 years old. On 12 April 2016, Pope Francis accepted Viganò's resignation and named Archbishop Christophe Pierre to succeed him as nuncio to the United States.

== August 2018 letter ==
On 25 August 2018, Viganò released an 11-page letter describing a series of warnings to the Vatican regarding Cardinal Theodore McCarrick. Two months earlier, on 20 June 2018, McCarrick had been removed from public ministry by the Holy See after a review board of the Archdiocese of New York found an allegation "credible and substantiated" that he had sexually abused a 16-year-old altar boy while a priest in New York.

According to Viganò's letter, in 2000, Gabriel Montalvo (then nuncio to the United States) had informed the Vatican of McCarrick's "gravely immoral behaviour with seminarians and priests." Subsequently, Viganò alleges, Pietro Sambi (nuncio from 2005 to 2011) informed the Vatican again before Viganò himself wrote his own memo regarding McCarrick in 2006. However, according to Viganò, nothing was done until Pope Benedict XVI to stop McCarrick.

On 27 July 2018, before the letter was released, Pope Francis ordered McCarrick to observe "a life of prayer and penance in seclusion" and accepted his resignation from the College of Cardinals, pending the results of a canonical trial.

=== Accusations against Pope Francis ===
Viganò says that in 2007 he wrote a second memo that included material from clerical sexual abuse expert Richard Sipe. Viganò says this led Pope Benedict XVI in 2009 or 2010 to place severe restrictions on McCarrick's movements and public ministry, not allowing him to venture beyond the seminary grounds where he was living, and not permitting him to say Mass in public. Viganò states that he spoke to Pope Francis about McCarrick's behavior in June 2013 and informed him of the restrictions that Benedict XVI had imposed on him. Nevertheless, Francis allegedly removed these sanctions and made McCarrick "his trusted counselor," even though Francis "knew from at least June 23, 2013 that McCarrick was a serial predator. He knew that he was a corrupt man, he covered for him to the bitter end."

In the letter containing these allegations, Viganò called on Francis and all others who covered up McCarrick's conduct to resign. Viganò stated: "In this extremely dramatic moment for the universal church, he [Pope Francis] must acknowledge his mistakes and, in keeping with the proclaimed principle of zero tolerance, Pope Francis must be the first to set a good example to cardinals and bishops who covered up McCarrick's abuses and resign along with all of them... We must tear down the conspiracy of silence with which bishops and priests have protected themselves at the expense of their faithful, a conspiracy of silence that in the eyes of the world risks making the church look like a sect, a conspiracy of silence not so dissimilar from the one that prevails in the mafia."

Francis convened a Meeting on the Protection of Minors in the Church from 21 to 24 February 2019, which led to his issuing the motu proprio Vos estis lux mundi, which specified the responsibility of bishops in handling cases and in reporting.

=== Accusations against others ===
In his letter, Viganò accused three consecutive Vatican secretaries of state, Cardinal Angelo Sodano, Cardinal Tarcisio Bertone, and Cardinal Pietro Parolin, of knowing about McCarrick's behavior but doing nothing about it.

Also in his letter, Viganò named several high-ranking prelates who he says were aware of Pope Benedict's restrictions on McCarrick, including Cardinal Donald Wuerl, Cardinal William Levada, Cardinal Marc Ouellet, Cardinal Lorenzo Baldisseri, Archbishop Ilson de Jesus Montanari, Cardinal Leonardo Sandri, Cardinal Fernando Filoni, Cardinal Angelo Becciu, and Bishop Robert McElroy. Viganò's letter says that these cardinals and prelates knew about McCarrick's sexual harassment of young adult seminarians; it does not say that anyone knew of McCarrick's sexual abuse of minors. Viganò stated that he had discussed McCarrick's conduct and the penalties surrounding it with Wuerl and accused him of putting seminarians at risk by allowing McCarrick to reside at the Redemptoris Mater Archdiocesan Seminary after his retirement despite knowing that he was accused of abusing seminarians.

Viganò also said that McCarrick "orchestrated" the appointments of Blase Cupich as Archbishop of Chicago and Joseph Tobin as Archbishop of Newark and Robert McElroy as Bishop of San Diego.

=== Assessments of letter by news media ===
The New York Times stated that Viganò's letter contained "unsubstantiated allegations and personal attacks," and described it as "an extraordinary public declaration of war against Francis' papacy at perhaps its most vulnerable moment." The Times said that during the time period that Viganò alleged McCarrick was subject to restrictions on his ministry, McCarrick continued to publicly celebrate Mass, and even joined with other bishops to present Pope Benedict a birthday cake in 2012. One notable mass which McCarrick participated in occurred at the 2010 papal consistory where Donald Wuerl, his successor as Archbishop of Washington D.C., was made a cardinal. McCarrick also made a public appearance at the Library of Congress in 2011 and joined other American bishops during their five-year "check-in" with Pope Benedict in January 2012. He made several trips to the Vatican during this period as well, and participated in a mass with other U.S. bishops at Saint Peter's tomb during the January 2012 visit. However, McCarrick had declined numerous requests in the summer of 2010 to be interviewed by The Washington Post, which described his 80th birthday celebrations in July of that year as "uncharacteristically quiet."

Viganò's defenders suggested that Benedict did not impose formal sanctions but instead made an informal request for McCarrick to assume a low profile and that he was then unwilling to enforce these restrictions. As evidence, they pointed to Benedict's other supposedly half-hearted attempts to discipline prelates accused of misconduct, the purportedly defiant behavior of McCarrick as an indicator that he could have ignored attempted restrictions, and contemporary media reports noting that McCarrick enjoyed a more visible role after Francis's election than he had while Benedict XVI was still pope. A 2014 news article referred to McCarrick as "one of a number of senior churchmen who were more or less put out to pasture during the eight-year pontificate of Benedict XVI," adding that after the election of Pope Francis he was put "back in the mix." He engaged in a number of high-profile diplomatic missions early in Pope Francis' pontificate, often at the behest of the Vatican. Archbishop Georg Gänswein, Pope Benedict's personal secretary and "trusted lieutenant," described reports that Pope Benedict confirmed Viganò's letter as "fake news." On 7 October, after being asked to come forward by Viganò, Cardinal Marc Ouellet stated that he was aware of informal restrictions that Benedict XVI had asked McCarrick to abide by, but that there were no formal sanctions.

Journalists at the time of the appointments of both Cupich and Tobin reported that McCarrick had recommended both for their positions as archbishop of Chicago and Newark, respectively, as consistent with the statement made in Viganò's testimony. Journalists Tornielli and Valente reported that, contrary to what Viganò suggests in his testimony, Cupich was indeed on the list of candidates sent to Rome (he was third) and had the support of other U.S. bishops. In 2014, McCarrick attempted to have a friend, Robert Furman, appointed Bishop of Fairbanks, Alaska, but the appointment went to a different person. The Guardian stated "Linking Pope Francis with the protection of a sexual abuser is false. But the rage behind it will not go away."

Viganò reported that the sanctions were instituted in 2009 and 2010, and that at that time, McCarrick was ordered to leave the grounds of Redemptoris Mater Archdiocesan Seminary, in which he was living. Two sources present at a 2008 meeting between Sambi and McCarrick told Catholic News Agency that Sambi ordered him to move out of the seminary and testified that Sambi said that it was at the instruction of Pope Benedict XVI. McCarrick left the seminary in around early 2009, and subsequently moved into the parish of St. Thomas the Apostle in Woodley Park, Washington D.C.

The Catholic magazine America proposed several reasons why some people find Viganò's letter credible, including Viganò's inside role in these matters as well as Pope Francis' alleged "lack of progress" and "lack of urgency" regarding sexual abuse; it also proposed several reasons why other people are skeptical about the letter, including public appearances made by McCarrick during the papacy of Pope Benedict and Viganò's "perceived hostility toward Pope Francis" for having removed him from his post in 2016, allegedly because Viganò was seen as having "become too enmeshed in U.S. culture wars, particularly regarding same-sex marriage." Viganò's handling of the investigation into Archbishop John Nienstedt for misconduct with adult seminarians was also subject to renewed scrutiny.

On 1 September 2018, The New York Times reported that Viganò had personally presented McCarrick with an award for missionary service in 2012 at the Pierre Hotel in Manhattan and praised him as "very much loved from us all." The article said that "if (former) Archbishop Viganò is to be believed, he was keeping a troubling secret." Conservative media countered by suggesting that he was unable to back out of the ceremony and exerted no control over it. Viganò himself said that he "couldn't make the slightest impression that I had something against the cardinal in public."

The Los Angeles Times quoted Villanova University professor of theology, Massimo Faggioli, "This letter has everything to do with factions in the church that are vying for power and influence,...You have a convergence of interests that is making this a huge mess in the U.S. Catholic Church."

=== Responses to letter ===
Cardinal Daniel DiNardo, president of the United States Conference of Catholic Bishops, released a statement declaring that Viganò's letter raised questions that "deserve answers that are conclusive and based on evidence. Without those answers, innocent men may be tainted by false accusation and the guilty may be left to repeat sins of the past."

The McCarrick case and Viganò allegations, happening at about the same time as the conclusion of the Grand jury investigation of Catholic Church sexual abuse in Pennsylvania, which alleged systematic cover-up of clergy sex abuse by bishops in Pennsylvania over decades, have intensified tensions in the Catholic Church between ideological liberals and conservatives. In addition to a general call from Catholics across ideological boundaries for greater accountability and transparency within the church, the allegations of sexual abuse have opened up ideological divisions within the church. Many conservative Catholics have focused on the alleged role of homosexuality in clergy sex abuse and have expressed concerns that Pope Francis is not sufficiently strict in enforcing doctrinal orthodoxy, while many Catholic liberals have blamed the sex abuse scandals on what they perceive to be the excessively hierarchical structure of the Catholic Church and have called for the church to be more welcoming and inclusive of homosexuals. Conservatives have often shown a willingness to accept at least some of Viganò's allegations, while liberals have more commonly criticized the letter and defended Pope Francis.

==== Reaction of Pope Francis ====
Asked by a reporter to respond to Viganò's allegations, Pope Francis replied,

I read the statement this morning, and I must tell you sincerely that, I must say this, to you [the reporter] and all those who are interested. Read the statement carefully and make your own judgment. I will not say a single word about this. I believe the statement speaks for itself. And you have the journalistic capacity to draw your own conclusions. It's an act of faith. When some time passes and you have drawn your conclusions, I may speak. But, I would like your professional maturity to do the work for you. It will be good for you.

According to veteran Vatican journalist John L. Allen Jr., the "clear suggestion" from Francis was that "if they did so, the charges would crumble under their own weight," while others saw the Vatican's silence and Viganò's strong insistence that documents related to the case be made public as indication that the latter was likely telling the truth. On 28 August, Bishop Thomas J. Paprocki of Springfield, Illinois, said, in reference to Francis's statement, "Frankly, but with all due respect, that response is not adequate." He called on all Vatican officials, including Francis, to "make public the pertinent files indicating who knew what and when...and provide the accountability that the Holy Father has promised." Bishop Marian Eleganti said that Francis's refusal "to say a single word about [the accusations against him] is a classic non-denial."

On 3 September, the Pope said, "With people who do not have good will, with people who seek only scandal, who seek only division, who seek only destruction, even within families," the answer is "silence. And prayer." Many found this to be a clear reference to his decision to remain silent about the scandal. On 11 September, referring to Satan, Pope Francis said:

In these times, it seems like the Great Accuser has been unchained and is attacking bishops...True, we are all sinners, we bishops. He tries to uncover the sins, so they are visible in order to scandalize the people...The Great Accuser, as he himself says to God in the first chapter of the Book of Job, 'roams the earth looking for someone to accuse'.

In an interview published on 28 May 2019, Francis directly addressed the accusations made in Viganò's letter for the first time. He stated that he "knew nothing" about McCarrick's conduct. Asked about Viganò's statement that he told Francis about McCarrick's behavior, he said: "I don't remember if he told me about this. If it's true or not. No idea! But you know that about McCarrick, I knew nothing. If not, I wouldn't have remained quiet, right?"

==== Supportive responses ====
Jean-François Lantheaume, who had served as first counsellor at the nunciature in Washington, D.C., stated that "Viganò said the truth," but declined to elaborate further. In his letter, Viganò had cited Lantheaume as the one who told him about the alleged "stormy" encounter between McCarrick and Sambi in which Sambi informed McCarrick of the sanctions being placed on him.

Thomas Olmsted, Bishop of Phoenix, stated that he had "always known and respected [Viganò] as a man of truthfulness, faith and integrity," and asked that the statements in his letter "be investigated thoroughly." Similarly, David Konderla, Bishop of Tulsa, stated that Viganò's allegations would be "a good place to begin the investigations that must happen." Joseph Strickland, Bishop of Tyler, went further, stating that he found Viganò's allegations "credible." Salvatore Cordileone, Archbishop of San Francisco, said that Viganò was a man of "selfless dedication" with "integrity and sincere love of the Church." Cordileone also said that his calls for Pope Francis's resignation "must be taken seriously."

Robert C. Morlino, Bishop of Madison, said that Viganò has "impeccable integrity" and he had "offered a number of concrete, real allegations in his recent document, giving names, dates, places, and the location of supporting documentation," and that these allegations justified a canonical investigation. Morlino also expressed disappointment that Pope Francis had not given a direct response when asked about this matter, and accused the National Catholic Reporter of "leading the charge in a campaign of vilification against (former) Archbishop Viganò."

Paprocki called on all Vatican officials, including Francis, to "make public the pertinent files indicating who knew what and when...and provide the accountability that the Holy Father has promised." Archbishop Paul Stagg Coakley professed to having "the deepest respect for (former) Archbishop Viganò and his personal integrity" and called for an investigation and a "purification" of the church. Bishop Athanasius Schneider of Kazakhstan stated that there was "no reasonable and plausible cause to doubt the truth content of the document." He demanded "ruthlessness and transparency" in cleansing the church of evils, particularly "homosexual cliques and networks" in the curia.

==== Critical responses ====
Some American bishops were critical of Viganò's missive. Cardinal Joseph Tobin, Archbishop of Newark, released a statement criticizing Viganò's statement for "factual errors, innuendo and fearful ideology." Cardinal Blase Cupich, Archbishop of Chicago, said that the language of the letter seemed political: "It was so scattershot that it was hard to read if it was ideological in some ways, or it was payback to others for personal slights that he had because there were some people who in his past he felt had mistreated him." Cupich said that he was "taken aback" by the negative language Viganò used with regard to him. Cupich described the letter as a distraction from the church's "bigger agenda": "We have to speak about the environment, about the poor, we have to reach out to people who are marginalized in society. We cannot be distracted at this moment." When asked about those criticizing Francis, he responded, "Quite frankly, they also don't like him because he's a Latino." Pope Francis was born in Argentina, to parents of Italian descent.

Robert McElroy, Bishop of San Diego, said that the letter, instead of seeking "comprehensive truth," showed "partisanship, division and distortion" in "its ideologically-driven selection of bishops who are attacked, in its clear efforts to settle old personal scores, in its omission of any reference to Viganò's own massive personal participation in the covering up of sexual abuse by bishops, and most profoundly in its hatred for Pope Francis and all that he has taught." Contrary to Viganò's statements, a spokesman for Wuerl stated that he had never received any information from Viganò concerning restrictions on McCarrick. On 30 August, Wuerl wrote a letter to priests in the archdiocese saying, "We need to hold close in our prayers and loyalty our Holy Father, Pope Francis. Increasingly, it is clear that he is the object of concentrated attack."

In an interview published on 27 November 2018, Cardinal Gerhard Ludwig Müller, Prefect Emeritus for the Congregation for the Doctrine of the Faith, criticized Viganò's language against Pope Francis, saying, "No one has the right to indict the pope or ask him to resign!" He said that these conversations "must take place in private, in the proper places, and without ever making a public controversy." Müller went on to say that such "attacks...end up questioning the credibility of the Church and her mission." He added that he is convinced that the Pope "is doing everything possible" to resolve the abuse scandal. Müller suggested that Pope Francis appoint a commission of cardinals to study the abuse scandal and called for unity amongst the church's different theological wings.

=== Involvement of Marco Tosatti ===
After the letter was published, Italian journalist Marco Tosatti said that he had helped Viganò write and edit the letter. Tosatti stated that Viganò "had called him a few weeks ago out of the blue asking to meet, and then proceeded to tell him the information that became the basis of the testimony." When they met, Viganò brought a draft of the document, and then Tosatti helped Viganò rewrite and edit it. Tosatti said the reason Viganò wrote the letter now was that "77 is an age where you start preparing yourself [...] he couldn't have a clear conscience unless he spoke." After the document was completed, Tosatti located publications that were willing to publish the letter: the Italian daily La Verità, the English-language National Catholic Register and LifeSiteNews, and the Spanish website InfoVaticana.

=== Follow-up letters and response from Cardinal Ouellet ===
On 27 September 2018, Viganò released a follow-up letter (dated 29 September). In this letter, Viganò explained why he had broken the "pontifical secret" by publishing his first letter. He criticized Francis for not having responded directly to the original letter, but instead having compared his critics to Satan. Viganò stated that it was Cardinal Marc Ouellet who had informed him of the sanctions that Benedict XVI had allegedly placed on McCarrick, and urged Ouellet to publicly confirm this statement. He wrote, "Neither the pope, nor any of the cardinals in Rome have denied the facts I asserted in my testimony."

On 7 October, Cardinal Ouellet replied to Viganò in a public letter. He confirmed that during the papacy of Benedict XVI, McCarrick "had been requested not to travel or to make public appearances", but he insisted that these restrictions placed on McCarrick should not be seen as "sanctions" or "formally imposed", referring to them rather as "conditions and restrictions that he had to follow on account of some rumors about his past conduct." He defended the decision not to impose formal sanctions on him, stating that this was a matter of "prudence" as there was not yet sufficient evidence to implicate him. Ouellet also confirmed that in 2011, he had "verbally" told Viganò about the restrictions on McCarrick. However, he argued that as these were not formal sanctions, Viganò's letter was "false" for saying that Benedict imposed sanctions on McCarrick which Francis subsequently lifted. In other passages, Ouellet called Viganò's accusations "far-fetched," "blasphemous," "incomprehensible," and "abhorrent."

Many journalists and analysts have said that, despite denouncing the Archbishop, Ouellet confirmed in substance one of Viganò's key statements: restrictions, even if non-canonical penalties, were imposed on McCarrick because the Vatican authorities were not only aware of the accusations but believed them to be true, even if they lacked probative evidence.

On 19 October, Viganò released a third letter in which he alleged that, despite Ouellet's denials, for years "the Holy See was aware of a variety of concrete facts" concerning McCarrick's activities, and that documents proving this allegation are kept in the Vatican Archives. Concerning Ouellet's response to Viganò's second letter, which included heavy criticism, Viganò said, "Cardinal Ouellet concedes the important claims." He denounced the "conspiracy of silence" in the church hierarchy which he believes oppresses victims and protects abusers. Viganò ended the letter by urging other bishops to come forward with what they knew: "You too are faced with a choice. You can choose to withdraw from the battle, to prop up the conspiracy of silence and avert your eyes from the spreading of corruption or choose to speak." Eight days later, Cardinal Agostino Cacciavillan stated that he received a complaint about McCarrick in 1994 while serving as papal nuncio, and then forwarded it to Cardinal John O'Connor of New York, who supposedly conducted an investigation that yielded nothing. Cacciavillan said that he did not attempt to directly contact the Vatican.

On 10 January 2019, The Washington Post published a story stating that Wuerl, despite his past denials, was aware of allegations against McCarrick in 2004 by former priest Robert Ciolek and reported them to the Vatican. Both the Diocese of Pittsburgh and the Archdiocese of Washington, D.C. acknowledged that Wuerl knew about and had reported Ciolek's allegation to the Vatican.

On 14 January, Viganò urged McCarrick to publicly repent for his actions, telling him that his "eternal salvation is at stake." He continued, "Time is running out. But you can confess and repent of your sins, crimes and sacrileges, and do so publicly, since they have themselves become public."

In February 2019, French author Frédéric Martel affirmed that Pope Francis's aides told him that Viganò had informed Francis about allegations involving seminarians but that Francis had dismissed them. According to Martel, "when the Pope dismissed the allegations, his entourage indicated to me that 'Francis was initially informed by Viganò that Cardinal McCarrick had had homosexual relations with over-age seminarians, which was not enough to condemn him.'"

=== Release of McCarrick correspondence ===
Correspondence obtained by Crux, which was released on 28 May 2019, shows that Benedict XVI imposed travel restrictions on McCarrick in 2008, as Viganò said. However, McCarrick gradually began to resume travelling. The correspondence also indicates that, contrary to Wuerl's denials, he was aware of the restrictions imposed on McCarrick. McCarrick writes that he discussed the restrictions with Wuerl in 2008, saying that his "help and understanding is, as always, a great help and fraternal support to me". However, a spokesperson for Wuerl denied that he had any such knowledge.

In 2019, Viganò gave his first extended interview since he released his allegations by corresponding through email with The Washington Post. It was released in June of that year. In it, he accused Pope Francis of defrocking McCarrick without a trial in order to avoid the possibility of having other bishops who knew about or covered up for McCarrick implicated. "Moreover, having made the sentence definitive, the pope has made it impossible to conduct any further investigation, which could have revealed who in the Curia and elsewhere knew of McCarrick's abuses, when they knew it, and who helped him to be named archbishop of Washington and eventually a cardinal. Note, by the way, that the documents of this case, whose publication had been promised, have never been produced," he said.

In an interview from September 2019, McCarrick, who continued to maintain his innocence, commented on Viganò's allegations. "He was talking as a representative of the far right, I think. I don't want to say he's a liar, but I think some of the bishops have said that he was not telling the truth", he said.

=== Vatican report ===
A report released by the Vatican on 10 November 2020 included additional information about reports surrounding McCarrick's behavior. The report states that John Paul II had heard rumors about McCarrick engaging in sexual misconduct but did not believe them. It largely supports Viganò's contention about restrictions being imposed under the papacy of Benedict XVI, stating that Benedict had received a complaint concerning sexual molestation by McCarrick against a seminarian and that the Vatican Office for Bishops attempted to impose restrictions on his public activities but that he refused to abide by them. The report singles out Viganò by stating that he called for an "exemplary measure" against McCarrick while working for the Office of the Secretariat of State, but says that Benedict decided to keep the restrictions private. The report mostly fails to support the accusations levied by Viganò against Pope Francis. It says that Francis, before becoming pope, had heard of allegations against McCarrick but believed them to be rejected by John Paul II, and that he had heard rumors of immoral sexual behavior by McCarrick but that he did not receive documentation about it until 2017, and that he did not learn of any allegation of McCarrick abusing minors until 2018. It refutes the idea that Francis made McCarrick an important advisor or that he sought to cover for him.

== Subsequent activities ==
=== Conspiracy theories and Donald Trump ===
In May 2020, the National Catholic Reporter reported that a number of German bishops had rejected COVID-19 conspiracy theories spread by Viganò, saying that "populists and other conspiracy theorists [...] want to interpret all efforts to contain the pandemic as a pretext to found a hate-filled technocratic tyranny and wipe out Christian civilization." Viganò had circulated an appeal he wrote and posted on the website Veritas Liberabit Vos in which he criticized "disproportionate and unjustifiable restrictions" on the "exercise of freedom of worship, expression and movement" enacted during the COVID-19 pandemic, saying it was "social engineering" and "subtle forms of dictatorship" that violated "inalienable rights of citizens and their fundamental freedoms" and were a "disturbing prelude to the realization of a world government beyond all control". He cast doubt on the "contagiousness, danger and resistance of the virus". He said that "foreign powers" and "shady interests" were interfering in domestic affairs and were part of a "plot to create a world government" that "would result in the permanent imposition of unacceptable forms of restriction on freedoms".

In his 7 June 2020 letter to then-President Donald Trump, which was published on LifeSiteNews, Viganò made "apocalyptic claims about a looming spiritual battle and a globalist conspiracy pursuing a one-world government", according to the Catholic News Agency. Viganò said that some Catholic bishops were aligned with the New World Order conspiracy, and that they invoked the Masonic "universal brotherhood" — also part of the new world order plot. He described the protests and the COVID-19 restrictions and lockdowns as a biblical struggle between light and dark, urging President Trump to fight against the deep state in the United States, which included responding to the protests. Viganò alleged that the protests were organized by Ex-President Joe Biden who embodies the deep state goals. President Trump responded favorably to the letter in a Tweet and encouraged everyone to read Viganò's letter.

Journalists, from Radio Canada, The New York Times and historian and theologian Massimo Faggioli, traced the link between President Trump and Viganò, to Viganò's appointment in 2011 as Nuncio to the United States. In 2008, when President Obama was elected, American Catholics had increased their influence through their alliance with the Tea Party, according to Faggioli. Faggioli said that in Washington over the next five years, Viganò "forged close ties" with the "militant fringe" of traditionalist Catholics and gradually embraced conspiracy theories. When Pope Francis became Pope, some Catholics in the United States believed it was part of a globalist elite plot to liberalize the Catholic Church. Faggioli said that Trump had popularized and normalized the conspiracy theories, so that when Viganò published of a series of letters with strong conspiratorial overtones from May to October 2020, Trump's "most ardent Catholic supporters" had adhered to Viganò's messages.

In a July 2020 interview, Viganò accused Pope Francis of following the 'homosexual agenda of the New World Order'.

On 30 October 2020, Viganò wrote another letter to President Trump which framed the World Economic Forum's Great Reset initiative within the context of the New World Order global conspiracy theory "against God and humanity". He said the Great Reset was led by the "global élite" who wanted to "subdue" humanity using "coercive measures" to "limit individual freedoms". Viganò said the price of a promised basic universal income from the International Monetary Fund would be the "renunciation of private property". He warned that a digital ID, a health passport, and Bill Gates' vaccination would become mandatory, and refusal to comply would result in internment. Viganò said that the lockdowns in the early months of 2021 were part of the activation of the Great Reset. Viganò said in the 30 October letter that then-President Trump represented the "final garrison against the world dictatorship" and that the United States represented a "defending wall" in a "war" against globalists, such as the President of the United States Joe Biden, Pope Francis (whom Viganò addresses as simply Jorge Mario Bergoglio), Italy's Prime Minister Giuseppe Conte, France's President Emmanuel Macron, and Spain's Prime Minister Pedro Sánchez. Sections of this letter were included in an article by The Spectator columnist, James Delingpole—a key proponent of the great reset conspiracy theory—a version of the anti-lockdown conspiracy. One Church official said that he was "simply stunned at what is being disseminated in the name of the Church and Christendom: crude conspiracy theories without facts or evidence combined with a right-wing populist combative rhetoric that sounds frightening." Viganò did not offer proof to support his claims, according to the CNA.

On 23 October 2021, Viganò addressed an open letter to the then President of the United States Conference of Bishops José Horacio Gómez, citing scientific papers for supporting his conspiracy theories about the COVID-19 pandemic. The letter stated that the vaccines had been authorised by skipping the human trial stage, in derogation of the rules of the scientific community. Moreover, since an experimental drug according to international standards can only be authorised in the absence of other alternatives, the health authorities had deliberately ignored low-cost and 'proven effective' treatment methods such as hydroxychloroquine, ivermectin and Dr Giuseppe De Donno's hyperimmune plasma, which rendered "the similar exorbitantly expensive, laboratory-produced monoclonal cell therapy useless". The WHO would reformulate the definition of 'vaccine' to include those against SARS-COV2 in this category, although the latter did not induce the production of protective antibodies and resistance against any specific disease. The letter warned of the deaths and short- and long-term damage caused by vaccines. Against vaccines, only the passive vigilance triggered by patients had been activated, which leads to an underestimation of adverse effects by about 10 times compared to what happens when the active vigilance of doctors is also activated. Finally, a theme taken up by conspiracy sites, it states that the presence of graphene in the doses administered, reported by numerous laboratories that have analysed their content, suggests that the forcible use of so-called vaccines – at the same time as the systematic boycott of existing cures with proven efficacy – serves to track the remote contacts of all vaccinated human beings worldwide, who will be or are already now connected to the Internet of Things by a quantum link of pulsating microwave frequencies of 2.4 GHz or higher from cellular towers and satellites.

=== Statements regarding Vatican II and Pope Francis ===
On 14 October 2019, the Ukrainian Orthodox Greek Catholic Church, an excommunicated sedevacantist group which is a split from the Ukrainian Greek Catholic Church, announced they had elected Viganò as their Pope. Whether Viganò accepted the result of this election is unclear.

In June 2020, Viganò said that the Second Vatican Council ushered in a schism where a false church exists within the Catholic Church alongside what he considers to be the true church. "The errors of the post-conciliar period were contained in nuce in the Conciliar Acts," he said. According to Viganò, the Council aimed to create the doctrinal premises to revolutionise the Catholic Church, making the Catholic Mass much more similar to Protestantism and trying to secularize Catholicism.

Viganò criticized the interreligious activities of Pope John Paul II and especially of Pope Francis, seeking to link actions undertaken during their pontificates to what he perceived to be errors or ambiguities in the council. "If the pachamama could be adored in a church, we owe it to Dignitatis humanae [Vatican II's Declaration on Religious Freedom] [...]. If the Abu Dhabi Declaration was signed, we owe it to Nostra aetate [Vatican II's Declaration on non-Christian religions]", he said. In response to the declaration, Father Raymond J. de Souza, editor of the conservative magazine Convivium, wrote a piece on the National Catholic Register accusing Viganò's of promoting schism and heresy and holding "a position contrary to the Catholic faith on the authority of ecumenical councils". Italian conservative Catholic commentator Sandro Magister described Viganò's position as "on the brink of schism". In November 2020, he denounced the Mass of Paul VI as a "liturgical rite[s] that seem to have been invented by Cranmer's perverse mind" and in January 2022 he announced that he was exclusively celebrating the Tridentine Mass.

In response to Traditionis custodes, a document issued by Pope Francis in July 2021 which imposed restrictions on the Tridentine Mass, Viganò called Francis a "non-Catholic pope". Following the enactment of Fiducia Supplicans, which allows priests to bless same-sex attracted individuals under certain conditions, Viganò described Pope Francis as a "false prophet" and a "servant of Satan".

=== Support for the Russian invasion of Ukraine ===
Viganò has been a vocal supporter of Russian President Vladimir Putin. In early March 2022, Viganò released a 10,000-word manifesto in which he pushed Russian disinformation; he adopted Putin's justifications for attacking Ukraine, blamed neo-Nazi groups in Ukraine for the conflict, and asserted that the United States and Europe should "form an alliance" with Russia "in view of the reconstruction of a Christian Civilization, which alone can save the world from the globalist techno-health transhuman monster".

The manifesto drew sharp criticism from many Catholic commentators, including some who had earlier lent their support to Viganò's attacks against Francis. British Catholic commentator Damian Thompson, associate editor of The Spectator and former editor-in-chief of the Catholic Herald, described Viganò's statement as "repulsive", while J.D. Flynn, editor of The Pillar, argued that the missive was written by someone else under Viganò's name. Italian traditionalist Catholic author Roberto de Mattei accused Viganò of collaborationism. American conservative Catholic commentator George Weigel dismissed the document as "absurdities" and critiqued him for repeating Kremlin propaganda.

On 16 March 2023, Viganò published a new open letter in which he welcomed the "International Movement of Russophiles" and lauded Russia as "the last bastion of civilization against barbarism" and the center of "all those nations that do not intend to submit to the colonization of NATO, the United Nations, the World Health Organization, the World Bank, the International Monetary Fund." Viganò also promoted the COVID-19 conspiracy theories (referring to the pandemic as a "farce conducted with criminal methods") and claimed that George Soros, Klaus Schwab and Bill Gates had "deliberately provoked" the Russia-Ukraine war "with the aim of destroying the social and economic fabric of nations, decimating the world population, [and] concentrating control in the hands of an oligarchy"; he also claimed that this was connected to conspiracies to prevent Donald Trump from being re-elected in 2020 and force Pope Benedict XVI to resign in 2013. Mike Lewis, managing editor of the progressive Catholic website Where Peter Is, described the letter as "the most astounding and bizarre public document created by this deeply troubled man to date".

=== New seminary and re-consecration ===
In July 2023, Viganò established the association Exsurge Domine to provide support to clergy, laity and religious who have been suspended, laicized and or sanctioned by the Catholic hierarchy due to their traditionalist positions.

In his December 2023 newsletter, Viganò announced the establishment of a traditionalist Catholic seminary called Collegium Traditionis in Viterbo, providing training to seminarians not willing to accept "the errors of the Second Vatican Council or the deviations of Bergoglio". He claimed to follow the example of Archbishop Marcel Lefebvre (Lefebvre founded the Écône Seminary in opposition to the Second Vatican Council and incurred automatic (latae sententiae) excommunication, which Pope John Paul II subsequently declared, for illicitly consecrating four bishops). According to Viganò, two seminarians have already enrolled.

In January 2024, it was conjectured by some sources that Viganò had been conditionally re-consecrated to the episcopate by Bishop Richard Williamson (Williamson's excommunication, along with the excommunications of the other bishops consecrated by Archbishop Lefebvre in the 1988 Écône consecrations, were lifted in 2009 by Benedict XVI. Bishop Williamson was excommunicated again in 2015 after illicitly ordaining Jean-Michel Faure a bishop without papal mandate in Nova Friburgo, incurring an automatic excommunication). The conditional re-consecration seems to imply that Viganò now believes that sacraments confected through the current Roman Missal are of dubious validity and, as such, his own consecration as bishop in 1992 by Pope John Paul II is dubious as well. Should the news be confirmed by papal authorities, Viganò would be excommunicated latae sententiae.

After being questioned by the conservative Catholic website New Daily Compass on the issue, Viganò did not deny the news and declared himself astonished by the publication's interest in his personal affairs. The New Daily Compass criticized Viganò's actions as schismatic.

In April 2024, Viganò was involved in an online spat with Bishop James Patrick Powers of Superior, whom Viganò referred to as "a squalid official of the ecumenical religion" and "not a Successor of the Apostles, but a servant of Freemasonry". The insults referred to the fact that Bishop Powers had celebrated a Mass in the Cathedral of Christ the King in Superior, Wisconsin, which featured four Ojibwe women engaging in traditional dance while accompanied by Indigenous drumming. Powers replied with an official statement, stating that the Ojibwe women were all Catholic and that similar Masses had been celebrated for a long time, one of which had been attended by Viganò himself, who did not protest. He called Viganò's statement a "violation of my right to a good name and reputation", requesting a public apology; he also accused Viganò of having illicitly ordained a man called Bryan Wallman to the priesthood, who had later established an illegal Hermitage of Jesus, Mary, and Joseph in Cumberland, Wisconsin.

== Excommunication ==
On 20 June 2024, Viganò announced on Twitter that the Disciplinary Section of the Dicastery for the Doctrine of the Faith had initiated a canonical criminal trial against him for schism. Viganò was accused of making "public statements resulting in a denial of the elements necessary to maintain communion with the Catholic Church: denial of the legitimacy of Pope Francis, breaking of communion with him, and rejection of the Vatican Council II." Viganò referred to the charges as a "badge of honour" and called the Second Vatican Council an "ideological, theological, moral, and liturgical cancer," of which "the Synodal Church" is a "necessary metastasis".

Commenting on the affair, Cardinal Secretary of State Pietro Parolin said that "Viganò has taken some attitudes and some actions for which he must answer"; he also told journalists "I am very sorry because I always appreciated him as a great worker, very faithful to the Holy See, someone who was, in a certain sense, also an example. When he was apostolic nuncio he did good work. I don't know what happened."

Viganò said that he did not recognise the authority of the Dicastery's prefect, nor Pope Francis's authority, and refused to take part in the proceedings. Several days later, Viganò accused Pope Francis of heresy and schism, calling for his removal from the Chair of Saint Peter "which he has unworthily occupied for over 11 years"; he also reiterated his rejection of the Second Vatican Council.

On 5 July 2024, the dicastery announced that Viganò had been found guilty of schism and had thus been excommunicated latae sententiae. Viganò retained his title of "archbishop" but his excommunication, as a matter of canon law, means that he is not permitted to hold positions within the church, celebrate Mass publicly, or administer sacraments. Viganò was not punished with the loss of clerical state (laicization).

Viganò is the fifth bishop of the Catholic Church to be excommunicated for schism since the Second Vatican Council, the others being Ngô Đình Thục (in 1976 and then again in 1983, reconciled with the church before death), Marcel Lefebvre (1988), Antônio de Castro Mayer (1988) and Emmanuel Milingo (2006), and before the Second Vatican Council, Carlos Duarte Costa (1945).

Viganò subsequently announced that he wanted to continue celebrating the Mass and the other sacraments; not recognizing the validity of the excommunication.

== Family estate ==
On 15 November 2018, it was revealed that a civil court in Milan, Italy, had issued a ruling in October 2018 which ordered Viganò to surrender €1.8 million of inheritance, plus interest and legal fees, to his brother Lorenzo Viganò. He had been managing his brother's inheritance since their father's death in 1961 and was ordered to pay back his brother Lorenzo, a priest of the Italian Diocese of Pavia who has resided in Chicago, and with whom the archbishop has long had strained relations, compensation for the money which he used allegedly from Lorenzo's share in the inheritance, along with interest and legal fees. The money which Lorenzo received accounted for half of what Viganò collected from the inheritance. Lorenzo had previously filed a lawsuit against Viganò in 2010 as well, but later dropped his first case in 2014 after Viganò agreed to donate $180,000 to a children's hospital in Tanzania where a daughter of their sister Rosanna Viganò was working, and also return to Rosanna €8,600 (US$11,000) used in 1983 in order to buy an apartment.

Viganò's critics allege he sought to use Lorenzo's health problems, which resulted from a stroke, as a reason to avoid taking the position as nuncio to the United States, saying that he needed to care for his brother, whereas the real reason was that Viganò was seeking to obtain better access to the family's possessions, which he would get by remaining in Rome.

Viganò denied the accusations. His supporters said they were a smear campaign designed to discredit him. The other siblings of Viganò have come forward in a press release to support him in the case against their brother Lorenzo.

== See also ==
- Foreign relations of the Holy See
- List of ambassadors of the United States to the Holy See
- List of diplomatic missions of the Holy See
- List of heads of the diplomatic missions of the Holy See

Diplomatic posts
Preceded by Paul Fouad Tabet	Apostolic Nuncio to Nigeria; 3 April 1992 – 4 April 1998	Succeeded by Osvaldo Padilla
Preceded by Pietro Sambi	Apostolic Nuncio to the United States; 19 October 2011 – 12 April 2016	Succeeded by Christophe Pierre
Catholic Church titles
Preceded by Salvatore Boccaccio	— TITULAR — Archbishop of Ulpiana; 3 April 1992 – 4 July 2024	Succeeded by –
Preceded by Francesco Monterisi	Delegate for Pontifical Representations; 4 April 1998 – 16 July 2009	Succeeded by Luciano Suriani
Preceded by Renato Boccardo	Secretary-General of the Governatorate of the Vatican City State; 16 July 2009 – 3 September 2011	Succeeded by Giuseppe Sciacca
