= Meeting on the Protection of Minors in the Church =

Summit in the Vatican City

Coordinates: 41°54′02.51″N 012°27′16.91″E

- Host country: Vatican City
- Date: February 21–24, 2019
- Motto: Responsibility, Accountability, Transparency
- Venues: New Synod Hall, Vatican City
- Website: www.pbc2019.org

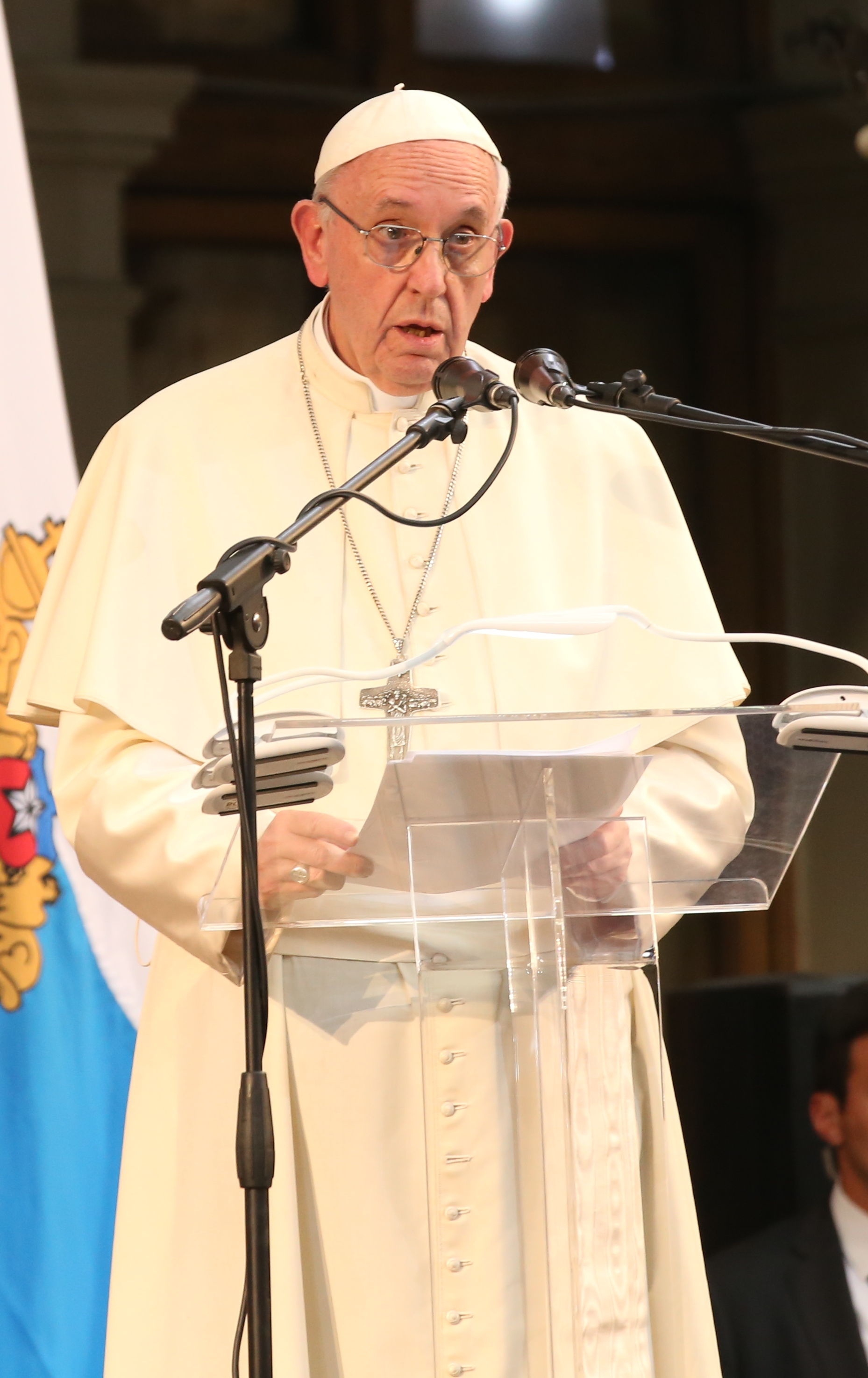
Pope Francis making a speech in the Pontifical Catholic University of Chile (2018). The Catholic Church in Chile in 2018 suffered one of the worst of the worldwide Catholic sexual abuse cases, including the Fernando Karadima case, resulting in several convictions and resignations.

The Vatican sexual abuse summit, officially the Meeting on the Protection of Minors in the Church (Italian: Incontro su “La Protezione dei Minori nella Chiesa”), was a four-day Catholic Church summit meeting in Vatican City that ran from 21 to 24 February 2019, convened by Pope Francis to discuss preventing sexual abuse by Catholic Church clergy.

== Background ==
Cases of child sexual abuse by Catholic priests, nuns and members of religious orders in the 20th and 21st centuries have led to many allegations, investigations, trials and convictions as well as revelations about decades of attempts by the Church to cover up reported incidents. Many bishops and religious superiors have denied the existence or downplay the severity of sexual abuse cases in an attempt to preserve the reputation of their priests and the church.

During Pope Francis' visit to Chile in January 2018, he defended a Chilean bishop from charges of sexual abuse, stating that accusations without evidence was simply slander. The public outcry in response to Francis' words prompted him to open a new Vatican investigation into the case, assigning Archbishop Charles J. Scicluna to the task. Upon realizing his mistake following results of the investigation, Francis apologized in person to the victims of the case, and summoned the Chilean bishop conference to Rome to discuss the failures of the Church hierarchy. The meeting concluded with all 34 Chilean bishops offering their resignations in writing.

The following June, it was revealed that the Archdiocese of New York had found two accusations of child sexual abuse against the see's former Auxiliary Bishop, Theodore McCarrick, "credible and substantiated." Several of McCarrick's former victims spoke out over the following months, and a seminary formerly under his purview was placed under investigation following reports of widespread sexual misconduct in the Diocese of Metuchen and the Archdioceses of Newark and Washington D.C. McCarrick lost the title of Cardinal after being found guilty of the allegations by the Congregation for the Doctrine of the Faith.

On August 14, a grand jury report from the Pennsylvania Attorney General was released which detailed over 1,000 child victims of sexual abuse by around 300 priests in six of the state's dioceses between the 1960s and the present. While describing the abuse, the report also indicated that several bishops responsible who oversaw those dioceses at the time were still in office. Following the report's release, Cardinal Daniel DiNardo, president of the United States Conference of Catholic Bishops, citing both the revelations around McCarrick and those in the Grand Jury Report as a "moral catastrophe," called for a Vatican investigation into the American church with the aim to bring about "practical changes to avoid repeating the sins and failures of the past." On August 20, 2018, Pope Francis issued an apostolic "Letter of His Holiness to the People of God," citing a report that was made public in recent days "which detailed the experiences of at least a thousand survivors, victims of sexual abuse, the abuse of power and of conscience at the hands of priests over a period of approximately seventy years."

On August 25, former apostolic nuncio to the United States Archbishop Carlo Maria Viganò released an 11-page "testimony" in which he accused several churchmen, including Cardinal Donald Wuerl of Washington, D.C. and Pope Francis, of having known of the accusations against McCarrick years prior and failing to act appropriately on them. The retired nuncio called on Francis to resign.

== Announcement ==
On 12 September 2018, Paloma García Ovejero, the vice director of the Holy See Press Office, announced Pope Francis' decision to call a global summons for a meeting on clergy sexual abuse. Francis made the decision during a meeting of his advisory Council of Cardinals. The meeting would occur at the Vatican from 21 to 24 February 2019, and would include religious superiors and all the presidents of the world's bishops' conferences. The Vatican said that the theme of the meeting would be "the protection of minors".

The summit was described as "unprecedented" and "the first of its kind".

== Pre-summit events ==
Ahead of the Vatican summit, the November 2018 U.S. Conference of Catholic Bishops Fall Assembly was considering its own proposals for procedures on how to handle bishops who have either abused children or who have been negligent in disciplining abusive priests. During this meeting, the Congregation for Bishops requested that any votes on such procedures be delayed. Cardinal Daniel DiNardo, the president of the conference, expressed disappointment with the intervention. The Vatican was worried that decisions that were agreed upon by American bishops could preempt discussions at the worldwide summit in February, possibly leading to perceived infringements on the authority of the Vatican by other parties. In response to the intervention from the Vatican, Cardinal Blase Cupich, the archbishop of Chicago, suggested that they continue discussing the proposals, and pass them to DiNardo as recommendations that he could then take to the summit in February.

Speaking with reporters on 27 January 2019, Pope Francis stated that the summit was intended to be a "catechesis" on the problem of abuse for the bishops who do not understand the issue or who are unsure how to handle the issue. In the summit, he would seek to impress the severity of the issue of abuse and clarify the role that the bishops must play in response to abuse.

On 18 February 2019, organizer Archbishop Scicluna stated that the summit would not solve all the problems. He said however that it would be reasonable to expect follow up, as this would be "of the essence". When asked if the summit would focus on abuse of minors or if it would also discuss abuse of seminarians and adults, organizer Cardinal Cupich said that they would be focusing on minors. He reasoned: "We are focusing in these days on those who have so little voice. Young people, minors, don't have a voice. This is about making sure that their voice is heard."

== Summit meeting ==
The summit ran from Thursday 21 through Sunday 24 February 2019. The invited delegation, numbering approximately 190, was primarily male. Of the participants, 10 were religious sisters, and 3 were women who would address the meeting. The participants also included 114 presidents of bishops' conferences, 14 leaders of Oriental Catholic Churches, 22 superiors of men and women religious, 14 members of the Vatican Curia, and 15 additional bishops and cardinals. The summit consisted of lectures and workshops on preventing sexual abuse, handling victims, and investigating abuse. The four days were divided into three thematic days, and one final day for Mass and a concluding address. The 1st day focused on responsibility, the 2nd day focused on accountability, and the 3rd day focused on transparency. Texts of most of the presentations are available at the Vatican website.

During the summit, victims of abuse gathered in Rome to protest, shouting "Zero tolerance!" Among the protestors was Alberto Athie of Mexico, one of the original accusers against Rev. Marcial Maciel.

=== Day 1: Responsibility ===
Pope Francis opened the summit by warning the attending bishops and religious superiors that their constituents were demanding concrete actions, not just words. Francis said, "The holy people of God are watching and expect not just simple and obvious condemnations, but efficient and concrete measures to be established." He offered a list of 21 proposals to consider going forward.

Bishops watched videotaped testimony of five victims from Europe, Africa, Asia, South America, and North America speaking about the trauma of their abuse. One victim from Chile said that when he came forward about his abuse, he was discredited and told that he was the enemy of the church. A victim from Africa spoke about how, from the age of 15, her priest would beat her if she refused to have sex with him. She got pregnant three times, and he forced her to have an abortion every time. A victim from Asia talked about how her religious superiors would cover up the abuse of nuns.

=== Day 2: Accountability ===
Cardinals called for more accountability in the Catholic Church. Cardinal Blase J. Cupich called for transparent legal procedures on how to report and investigate those accused of abuse and those negligent in handling abuse cases. He elaborated upon his "metropolitan model" proposal, in which metropolitan bishops would investigate suspected abuse with the consultation of lay experts, and then submit the results to the Vatican. He first brought up this proposal in response to the Vatican blocking the U.S. Conference of Catholic Bishops from voting on local American proposals on better handling sexual abuse cases the previous November.

=== Day 3: Transparency ===
German Cardinal Reinhard Marx admitted that in his own diocese files that documented sexual abuse of children were missing. He added that he did not think this was an isolated case. At times, church administration failed to create the appropriate documentation in the first place, and the procedures for prosecuting offenses were often cancelled and overridden. Marx stressed the need for transparency and traceability, so that abuse cases can be followed by victims and Catholics. Marx also condemned the use of pontifical secrecy to suppress abuse cases.

Veteran Vatican journalist Valentina Alazraki told gathered bishops, "if you do not decide in a radical way to be on the side of the children, mothers, families, civil society, you are right to be afraid of us, because we journalists, who seek the common good, will be your worst enemies."

=== Day 4: Papal priorities ===
Pope Francis ended the summit with a half-hour speech that included condemnations of the abuses by clergy and cautions against being too extreme in response to the crisis. During the speech, he said clergy who abuse children are "tools of Satan" and that such criminal behavior is "utterly incompatible with [the church's] moral authority and ethical credibility." However, in addressing the abuse, he said that the church must avoid falling into the extreme of "justicialism". Francis also discussed the wider impact of abuse, citing a 2017 UNICEF study on abuse in 28 countries. Francis ended his speech by stating an eight-point list of priorities. The list included a call to prioritize victims of abuse over the institution's reputation, and a call to stop the cover-ups and trivialization of abuses.

Rev. Federico Lombardi, moderator for the summit, announced that the Vatican would soon issue Vatican City State policies for child protection and guidelines for preventing sexual abuse of minors. Vatican City had no such policies in place previously. The Holy See had previously asked bishops conferences around the world to write up such child protection guidelines in 2011, and it had told the United Nations in 2014 that such guidelines were in the process of being written. Lombardi also said that they would create task forces of "competent persons" to help dioceses and episcopal conferences who experience difficulty in addressing the problems.

At the closing Mass, the Australian Archbishop Mark Coleridge said bishops and priests will not act alone, but will work with all concerned for the good of the young and the vulnerable. “All of this will take time”, he said, “but we do not have forever and we dare not fail.”

== Reactions ==
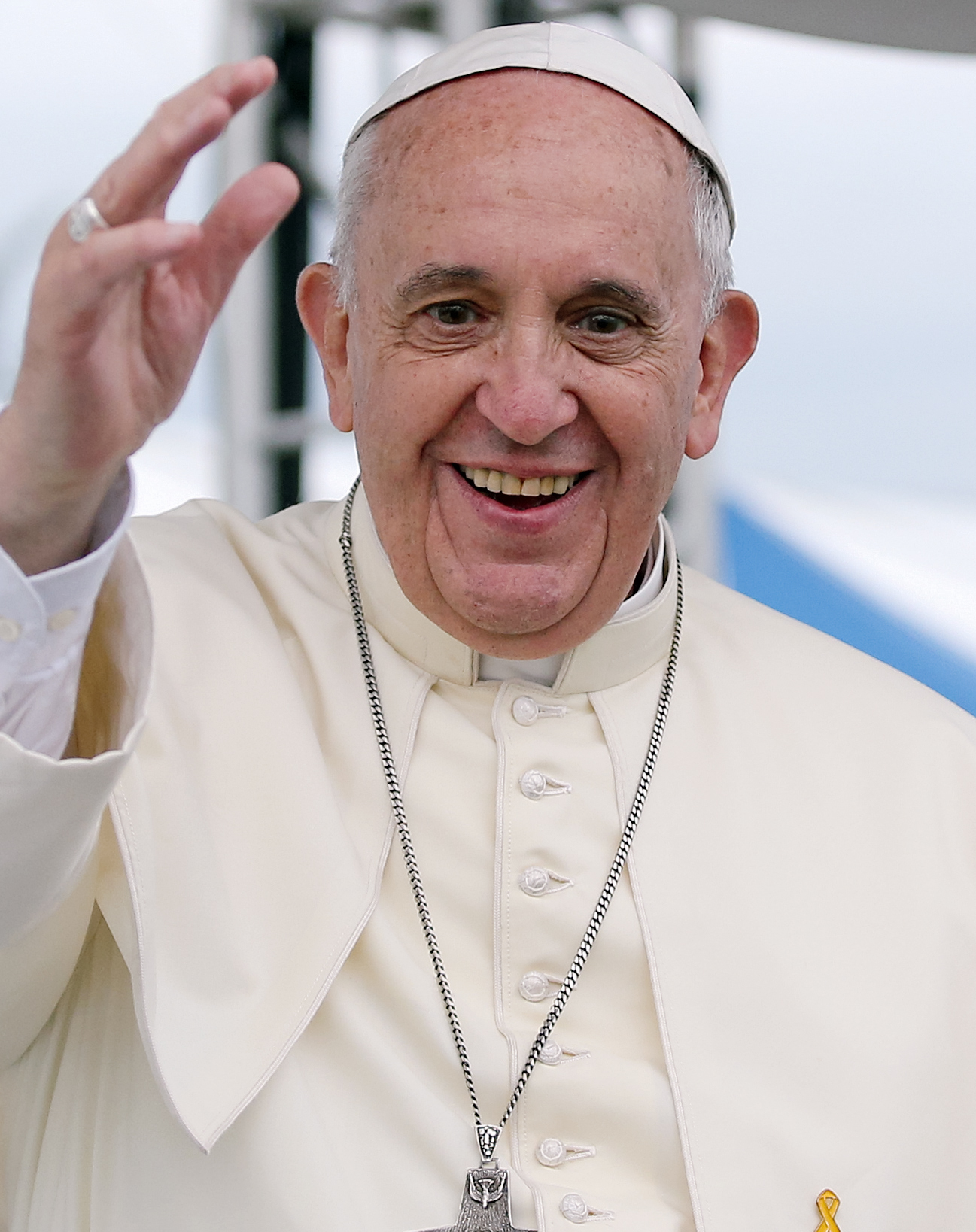
Pope Francis delivered the summit's closing remarks.

Reaction to the summit was mixed, with some praising the steps taken by the Vatican, and others criticizing the program as too narrow or not comprehensive enough.

In response to the initial announcement in September 2018, David Clohessy, former director of the victims’ advocacy group SNAP, expressed doubt that anything good would come of the meeting, citing decades of failure to reform. Christopher Bellitto, a church historian at Kean University in New Jersey, praised the action of holding a summit, but thought that it should occur more quickly than in six months. Massimo Faggioli, a professor of historical theology at Villanova University, noted how this conference represented a change of course from how the previous pontiffs had placed more emphasis on the authority of the individual bishop over the bishop conference. He said that the abuse crisis has changed this, resulting in a rebalancing.

Some critics accused the summit of being too narrowly focused on the abuse of minors at the expense of sexual misconduct and coercion by adults. JD Flynn, a canon lawyer and editor-in-chief of Catholic News Agency, noted that the gathering "doesn't aim to" resolve issues that largely plagued the church after the revelations regarding McCarrick. Flynn posed the question, "Will Catholics accept the presupposition that those who sexually abuse 17-year-olds have an entire different moral or psychological pathology than those who sexually abuse 18-year-olds, or who coerce them into the veneer of consent against the backdrop of an extraordinary power imbalance?" Some commentators questioned whether the steps taken at the summit would lead to greater accountability of bishops and thus prevent such a situation as arose with McCarrick.

For Anne Barrett Doyle, co-director of BishopAccountability.org, Francis' closing speech was a "stunning letdown". She elaborated, "We needed him to offer a bold and decisive plan. He gave us instead defensive, recycled rhetoric." Tim Lennon, the head of SNAP, said that he felt Pope Francis' ending remarks were inadequate. He said, "We’ve heard this condemnation, the apologies, the penance, the fasting, but they are all words. Unless he starts to fire a bishop who covered up sexual abuse and there are known, proven bishops, who have done that, then it just rings hollow."

Critics said that the summit was an inadequate response to an ongoing crisis – some victims said children were not safer in a meaningful way, and that the issue of accountability for bishops who covered up abuse was inadequately addressed.

== Follow-up ==
=== 2019 Vatican norms ===
On March 26, 2019, one month after the summit was held, Pope Francis adopted:

- Vatican Law No. CCXCVII On the protection of minors and vulnerable persons;
- the Motu Proprio On the protection of minors and vulnerable persons;
- the Guidelines of the Vicariate of Vatican City on the protection of minors and vulnerable persons.

According to Andrea Tornielli, these:

are very specific laws, norms and indications destined, first of all, for those to whom they are addressed: in fact, they concern only Vatican City State, where a large number of priests and religious work, but where there are very few children. Although they have been conceived and written for a unique reality, in which the highest religious authority is also the sovereign and legislator, these three documents contain exemplary indications that take into account the most advanced international parameters."

Law No. CCXCVII requires Vatican City officials, including those in the Roman Curia, and diplomatic personnel of the Holy See, such as the Apostolic Nuncios, to report sex abuse. Failure to do so can result in a fine of up to 5,000 euros (about US$5,600) or, in the case of a Vatican gendarme, up to six months in prison. In addition, all crimes related to child abuse, including mistreatment, are prosecutable "ex officio", even when the purported victim does not file an official report. The law also extends the statute of limitations to 20-year prescription that, in the case of and offence against a minor, begin to count from on his or her eighteenth birthday. In addition, the Governorate of the Vatican City State is required to set up, within the Vatican Department of Health and Welfare, service to support and assist the victims of abuse, providing them with medical and psychological assistance and informing them of their rights and of how to enforce them.

The motu proprio extends the application of the Vatican law to the Roman Curia and its personnel. It requires that, when recruiting staff, the candidate's suitability to interact with minors must be ascertained.

The Guidelines for the Vicariate of Vatican City are addressed to the canons, parish priests and coadjutors of the two parishes located within the Vatican, as well as to the priests, deacons and educators of the Saint Pius X Pre-Seminary, to all the men and women religious who reside in the Vatican, and to all those who work within the ecclesiastical community of the Vicariate of Vatican City. The guidelines require that, in the course of pastoral activities, those persons must always be visible to others when they are in the presence of minors, and that it is strictly forbidden to establish a preferential relationship with a single minor, to address a minor in an offensive way or to engage in inappropriate or sexually allusive conduct, to ask a minor to keep a secret, to photograph or to film a minor without the written consent of their parents. The Vicar of Vatican City has also the obligation to report to the Promoter of Justice any news of abuse that is not manifestly unfounded, and to remove the alleged perpetrator of the abuse from pastoral activities as a precautionary measure.

=== The Motu Proprio Vos estis lux mundi ===
On May 9, 2019, Pope Francis issued the Motu Proprio Vos estis lux mundi requiring both clerics and religious brothers and sisters, including Bishops, throughout the world to report sex abuse cases and sex abuse cover-ups by their superiors. Under the new Motu Proprio, all Catholic dioceses throughout the world are required to establish stable mechanisms or systems through which people may submit reports of abuse or its cover-up by June 2020. All metropolitan Archdioceses are also required to send reports to the Holy See on the progress of the investigation, whether in their Archdiocese or suffragan dioceses, every 30 days and to complete the investigation within 90 days unless granted an extension. The law is effective for a 3-year experimental period with a vacatio legis of 1 June 2019. According to Canon law professor Kurt Martens:

This new law is without a doubt a rare gift to the entire church and sets, along with the companion Vatican law providing for jail time for any public official of the Vatican who fails to report abuse, an unmistakable new course. The painful, sometimes bitter, experience of the church in the United States and the voices of the faithful worldwide have helped bring about a change in attitude and a change in law. There is no turning back now, and the tone has been set for the future.

=== The Rescript "On the confidentiality of legal proceedings" ===
On December 17, 2019 Pope Francis issued a canon law instruction "On the confidentiality of legal proceedings" lifting the "pontifical secret" in the cases relating to: violence or abuse of authority in forcing sexual acts, sexual abuse of minors or vulnerable persons, crimes of paedophilia involving children under 18 years of age or with incapacitated subjects and the concealment of those conducts from ecclesiastical or civil inquiries. Under the new provisions, are excluded from the pontifical secret all the stages of the canonical trials, from the denunciation, to the phase of the preliminary investigations, to the phase of the proper debate, and up to the final decision, as well as any witness statements and documents produced in trial. It concerns both the procedures that take place at the local level, and those that take place in Rome, at the Congregation for the Doctrine of the Faith.

The instruction provides however that the information obtain in a canonical trial be treated in such a way as to ensure its security, integrity and confidentiality with a view to protecting the good name, image and privacy of all persons involved. According to Archbishop Juan Ignacio Arrieta, Secretary of the Pontifical Council for Legislative Texts: "the fact that knowledge of these criminal actions is no longer bound by the “pontifical secret” does not mean that it provides the freedom to make it public by those in possession of it, which in addition to being immoral, would undermine the right to a good reputation". Moreover, the Instruction does not in any way counter the absolute duty of the Priest to observe the sacramental seal nor the duty of observe the confidentiality of information acquired outside of confession within the whole forum called "extra-sacramental".

The professional secret of those involved in a canonical trial should not constitute an obstacle to “the fulfilment of the obligations laid down in all places by the laws of the State, including any reporting obligations [of possible news of a crime], and the execution of the enforcement requests of the civil courts” which, naturally, could oblige the delivery of documentary material to the civil courts. In this regard, Prof. Giuseppe Dalla Torre, former president of the Vatican City State Tribunal, observed that:

Should the State law provide for the obligation to report on the part of those who are informed of the facts, the removal of papal secrecy and the clarification of the limits of official secrecy allow the fulfilment of the provisions of the law, thus promoting full cooperation with the civil authorities and avoiding unlawful incursions of civil authority in the canonical sphere. The same is true of executive measures of the state judicial authority, the non-compliance with which would subject – among other things – the competent ecclesiastical authority to serious sanctions for violation of criminal law.

Prof. Dalla Torre underlined that this instruction is a canonical instrument which does not affect the application of the civil laws as they regard the conduction of civil trials and the cooperation with ecclesiastica authorities:

It has been said that the Instruction is an internal act of the Church, but with repercussions outside the canonical order. It is obvious, however, to specify that, as far as the exercise of secular justice in the matter in question is concerned, it will be necessary to adhere the internal legislation of each State. For example, in the case of systems that provide for the prosecution of crimes of abuse only on complaint by one party, the fall of papal secrecy and, in the sense mentioned, of official secrecy, can only operate once the injured party has activated criminal proceedings with the due request to the judicial authority to proceed against the perpetrator of the crime. Furthermore: in the States with a concordatory regime, the new pontifical provisions will be implemented in harmony with the specific norms eventually in force for the protection of the sacred ministry. Finally, there remains a fundamental difference depending on whether the requests of the civil authorities are addressed to the local ecclesiastical authorities (Bishops, Major Superiors in the case of religious), or to the Holy See and, more precisely, to the Congregation for the Doctrine of the Faith. In the latter case, in fact, they must take place through those forms of judicial cooperation between different jurisdictional authorities, for the performance of activities relating to a process (such as the assumption of information or documents, etc.), known as letters rogatory. In the first case, instead, such requests will take place according to the internal provisions of the individual state systems. Certainly, in both cases, the proceeding civil authority will have to formulate the requests with detailed, precise and not generic indications, but this is a problem entirely internal to the state systems, which falls outside the sphere of competence of the canonical system.

According to Archbishop Charles Scicluna, adjunct secretary of the Congregation for the Doctrine of the Faith, the abolition of pontifical secrecy means that:

The documents in a penal trial are not public domain, but they are available for authorities, or people who are interested parties, and authorities who have a statutory jurisdiction over the matter. So I think that when it comes, for example, to information that the Holy See has asked to share, one has to follow the international rules: that is, that there has to be a specific request, and that all the formalities of international law are to be followed. But otherwise, on the local level, although they are not public domain, communication with statutory authorities and the sharing of information and documentation are facilitated.

== See also ==
- vos estis lux mundi
- Ecclesiastical response to Catholic sexual abuse cases
- Media coverage of Catholic sex abuse cases
- Grand jury investigation of Catholic Church sexual abuse in Pennsylvania
- Theodore McCarrick
