= InfoVaticana =

Spanish website covering the Catholic Church

- Website type: News
- Available in: Spanish, Italian
- Owner: Grupo Intereconomía
- Editor: Gabriel Ariza
- Website: infovaticana.com
- Commercial: Yes
- Registration: None
- Launched: 2013
- Current status: Active

InfoVaticana is an independent information website about the Catholic Church since founded in 2013 by Gabriel Ariza and Fernando Beltrán. Information is published in two languages: the Spanish language and the Italian language. The website takes a Vaticanist approach, discussing current affairs within the church from an orthodox Catholic point of view. During the reign of Pope Francis, the website has had legal action taken against it by the Vatican City for use of symbols related to the Vatican.

== History ==
InfoVaticana was founded as a business with a balance of around 2,000 euros by Gabriel Ariza and was registered in the Mercantile Registry of Madrid in November 2013. Ariza is the son of Julio Ariza, who was previously a member of the Parliament of Catalonia for the Spanish People's Party and has since been the owner of the Intereconomía Group.

Since 2013, InfoVaticana has stood out as an information portal about the Catholic Church, with a clear orientation towards doctrinal orthodoxy. They have covered various news of some importance in the national ecclesiastical sphere like the situation of the channel Trece (belonging to the Spanish Episcopal Conference), or the controversial election of the last president of the Asociación Católica de Propagandistas and the judicial process of the miguelianos group.

Although InfoVaticana began publishing in Spanish, in May 2015 the creation of an Italian version was announced. Gabriel Ariza, director of InfoVaticana, explained this decision to Religión en Libertad: "The number of readers who follow us from Italy has not stopped increasing, and Italian is today the universal language of the church: a large part of the more than five thousand bishops in the world have studied in Rome and many priests know that language well and are completely ignorant of Spanish, so the Italian edition will be for them a way to get closer to the reality of the church."

In August 2017, InfoVaticana received a notification from Baker McKenzie, a Chicago-based white shoe law firm, on behalf of Pietro Parolin (the Vatican Secretariat of State), asking them to transfer the domain to it, and stop using symbology related to the Vatican as it could be considered "a violation of the intellectual property of the Vatican". The case is part of a legal debate over whether the Holy See can claim full ownership of the "Vatican" brand and its derivatives.

== Political positions ==
Agence France-Presse characterizes InfoVaticana as conservative and critical of Pope Francis.

== Content ==
In addition to having their respective sections of blogs and news, InfoVaticana has the following sections:

- Formation: with articles related to the Catholic faith, catechesis, prayers, Marian devotions, etc.
- Profiles: of Spanish bishops, cardinals and members of the Roman Curia.
- Interviews: this section includes various digital interviews organized from the portal. This section includes interviews with readers by personalities such as Santiago Abascal.

== Contributors ==
Infovaticana hosts several blogs on its website, highlighting:

- La Cigüeña de la Torre by Francisco José Fernández de la Cigoña (also known as "Paco Pepe"), a Spanish secularist, commentator, and writer.
- El Olivo by Father Tomás de la Torre Lendínez, diocesan priest of Jaén
- Ite Ad Ioseph, a blog of the Barcelona Catholic group Hijos de San José, youth section of the Youth Association of San José.
- The blog of Father Manuel Guerra Gómez, priest and doctor in classical philology and patristic theology.
- The blog of Father José Antonio Fortea, Spanish exorcist, priest in Alcalá de Henares.
- The blog of Father José Luis Aberasturi, former professor, Fomento-Fundación chaplain, philologist, philosopher, and moral theologian.
- Adoración y Liberación of the same name as the web portal founded by Vicente Montesinos, a judicial officer who is linked to various initiatives within the Catholic Church (catechesis, formation, youth, etc.).

Also published are Spanish translations of articles by Italian ecclesiastical analyst Sandro Magister, and the American religious information magazine The Catholic Thing.

== See also ==
- Catholic Church in Spain
- Catholic Church in Italy
