= Salvatore Boccaccio =

Italian Roman Catholic bishop

- Bishop of Frosinone-Veroli-Ferentino
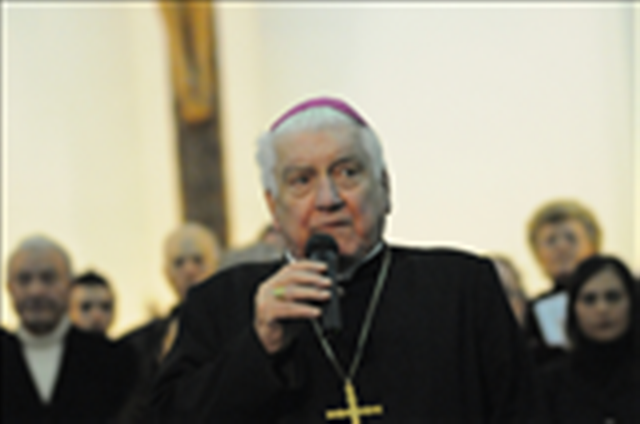
- Church: Catholic Church
- Diocese: Diocese of Frosinone-Veroli-Ferentino
- In office: 9 July 1999 – 18 October 2008
- Predecessor: Angelo Cella
- Successor: Ambrogio Spreafico
- Previous posts: Bishop of Sabina–Poggio Mirteto (1992-1999); Coadjutor Bishop of Sabina–Poggio Mirteto (1992); Titular Bishop of Ulpiana (1987-1992); Auxiliary Bishop of Roma (1987-1992)

Orders
- Ordination: 9 March 1963 by Luigi Traglia
- Consecration: 7 December 1987 by Ugo Poletti

Personal details
- Born: 18 June 1938 Rome, Kingdom of Italy
- Died: 18 October 2008 (aged 70) Frosinone, Lazio, Italy

Salvatore Boccaccio (18 June 1938, Rome – 18 October 2008, Frosinone) was the "Titular" Roman Catholic bishop of Ulpiana from 29 October 1987 – 2 April 1992. He was the bishop of Sabina-Poggio Mirteto, Italy from 17 March 1992 – 8 July 1999. He was also the bishop of Frosinone-Veroli-Ferentino, Italy from 9 July 1999, until his death on 18 October 2008, at the age of 70 years.
