= Pontifical secret =

Code of confidentiality in the Roman Catholic Church

The pontifical secret, pontifical secrecy, or papal secrecy is the code of confidentiality that, in accordance with the Latin canon law of the Catholic Church as modified in 1983, applies in matters that require greater than ordinary confidentiality:

Business of the Roman Curia at the service of the universal Church is officially covered by ordinary secrecy, the moral obligation of which is to be gauged in accordance with the instructions given by a superior or the nature and importance of the question. But some matters of major importance require a particular secrecy, called "pontifical secrecy", and must be observed as a grave obligation.

— Instruction Secreta continere of February 1974, introduction (Note: Original text: "Quod autem ad Curiam Romanam attinet, negotia, quae ab ea in universalis Ecclesiae servitium tractantur, communi secreto ex officio obteguntur, cuius moralis obligatio vel ex superioris praescripto vel ex rei natura et momento dimetienda est. At in quibusdam rebus gravioris momenti peculiare urgetur secretum, quod pontificium nuncupatur et gravi semper obligatione servandum est.")

Pontifical secrecy is the subject of the instruction Secreta continere of 4 February 1974 issued by the Secretariat of State. The text is published in Acta Apostolicae Sedis, 1974, pages 89–92.

Its applicability in cases of accusations and trials involving abuse of minors or vulnerable persons and in cases of possession of child pornography by clerics was removed on 17 December 2019. Its use in such cases had been condemned by German Cardinal Reinhard Marx at the Meeting on the Protection of Minors in the Church held in the Vatican from 21 to 24 February 2019.

== Matters covered by pontifical secret ==
The instruction Secreta continere lists ten classes of matters covered by the pontifical secret:

1. Preparation of papal documents, if pontifical secrecy is expressly demanded
2. Information obtained officially by the Secretariat of State in connection with questions requiring pontifical secrecy
3. Notifications sent to the Congregation for the Doctrine of the Faith about teachings and publications and the Congregation's examination of them
4. Extrajudicial denunciations of crimes against the faith and morals or against the sacrament of Penance, while safeguarding the right of the person denounced to be informed of the denunciation, if his defence against it makes this necessary. The name of the person making the denunciation may be made known to him only if it is judged necessary to have a face-to-face confrontation between denouncer and denounced.
5. Reports by papal legates on matters covered by pontifical secrecy.
6. Information obtained officially with regard to the naming of cardinals
7. Information obtained officially with regard to the naming of bishops and papal legates and the relative inquiries.
8. Information obtained officially with regard to the naming of the chief officers of the Roman Curia.
9. All matters concerning cipher systems and enciphered messages.
10. Any matter that the Pope, a Cardinal in charge of a department of the Roman Curia, or a papal legate considers to be of such importance that it requires the protection of papal secrecy.

== Matters excluded from the pontifical secret ==
The canon law instruction "On the confidentiality of legal proceedings" of 17 December 2019, excluded from the pontifical secret the accusations, trials and decisions in canonical investigations and trials involving:

1. violence or abuse of authority in forcing sexual acts,
2. sexual abuse of minors or vulnerable persons,
3. paedophilia involving children under 18 years of age or with incapacitated subjects,
4. concealment of those conducts from ecclesiastical or civil inquiries.

According to Archbishop Juan Ignacio Arrieta, Secretary of the Pontifical Council for Legislative Texts, the purpose of the Rescript of 17 December 2019 was to:

specify the degree of confidentiality with which news or reports of sexual abuse committed by clerics or consecrated persons against minors and other subjects determined herein must be handled, as well as any conduct by ecclesiastical authorities that might tend to silence or cover them up. As will be seen, the purpose of the new Instruction is to erase in these cases the subjection to what is called “papal secrecy”, instead bringing the “level” of confidentiality, duly required to protect the good reputation of the persons involved, back to the normal “official secrecy” established by can. 471, 2nd CIC (can. 244 §2, 2nd CCEO), which each Pastor or the holder of a public office is required to observe in different ways depending on whether they are subjects who have the right to know said information or whether, on the other hand, they do not have this right.

On its part, Prof. Giuseppe Dalla Torre, former president of the Vatican City State Tribunal, observed that the lifting of the Pontifical secret was due to the fact that:

the reasons that in the past had led the ecclesiastical legislator to introduce, among the matters subject to pontifical secrecy, the gravest offences reserved to the Congregation for the Doctrine of the Faith, have given way to matters that are now perceived as more elevated and worthy of special protection. First and foremost the primacy of the human person offended in his or her dignity, even more so for reasons of weakness due to age or natural incapacity. And then this full visibility of the passages in the canonical procedures intended to punish the criminal act, which contributes over time to the pursuit of justice and the protection of those involved, including those who can be unjustly affected by accusations that turn out to be unfounded.

According to Archbishop Charles Scicluna, adjunct secretary of the Congregation for the Doctrine of the Faith, the abolition of pontifical secrecy means that:

The documents in a penal trial are not public domain, but they are available for authorities, or people who are interested parties, and authorities who have a statutory jurisdiction over the matter. So I think that when it comes, for example, to information that the Holy See has asked to share, one has to follow the international rules: that is, that there has to be a specific request, and that all the formalities of international law are to be followed. But otherwise, on the local level, although they are not public domain, communication with statutory authorities and the sharing of information and documentation are facilitated.

== Sanctions for violation ==
While violation of pontifical secrecy, if deliberate, is a grave sin, and while an automatic excommunication may sometimes be imposed for violation of secrecy on particular matters, the general rule is only that, if the violation becomes known outside of Confession, a penalty proportionate to the wrongdoing and the damage caused is to be inflicted.

An example of the imposition of automatic excommunication for violation of secrecy was found in the 1962 instruction Crimen sollicitationis (in force until replaced by new norms in 2001), which imposed this penalty on members of a Church tribunal trying a priest accused of making sexual advances to a penitent in connection with the sacrament of Penance, if they violated secrecy about developments in the course of the ecclesiastical trial. A person to whom such advances were made was, on the contrary, subjected to excommunication if that person failed to denounce the priest within at most one month.

Thus the procedures of the Church tribunal were covered by papal secrecy (called at that time secrecy of the Holy Office), but the crime of the priest was not: "These matters are confidential only to the procedures within the Church, but do not preclude in any way for these matters to be brought to civil authorities for proper legal adjudication. The Charter for the Protection of Children and Young People of June, 2002, approved by the Vatican, requires that credible allegations of sexual abuse of children be reported to legal authorities."

== See also ==
- Crimen sollicitationis
