= José Antonio Fortea =

Spanish priest (born 1968)

The Reverend Fr. José Antonio Fortea Cucurull
- Catholic Priest, Exorcist, Writer
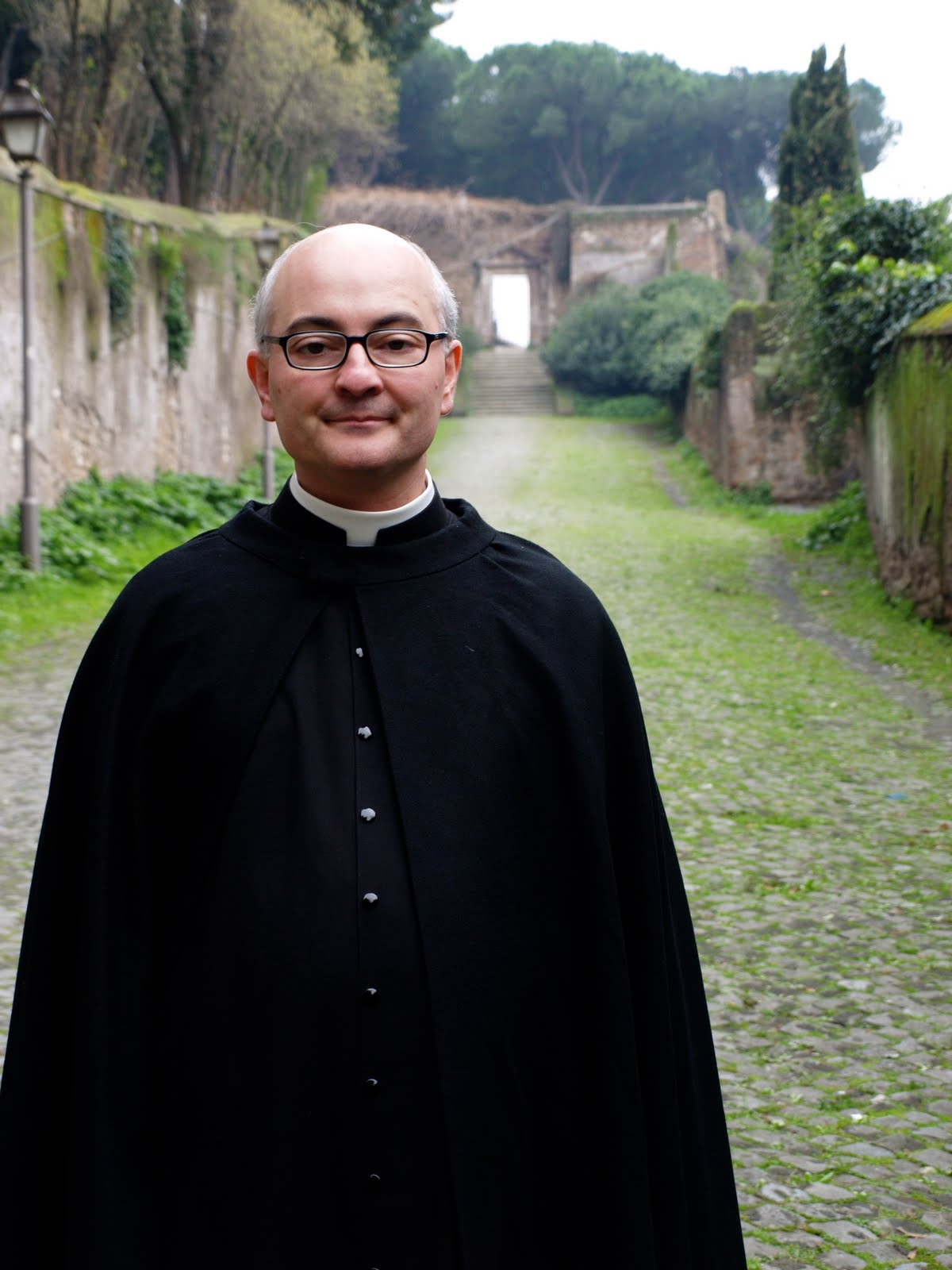
- Father Fortea
- Church: Catholic Church

Personal details
- Born: October 11, 1968 (age 57) Barbastro, Spain
- Denomination: Catholic Church

José Antonio Fortea Cucurull (born in Barbastro, Spain, October 11, 1968) also known as Father Fortea is a Spanish writer, and a Roman Catholic priest of the diocese of Alcalá de Henares (Madrid). He was appointed an exorcist in the past, but is no longer in office.

== Life ==
His father was a businessman and did not expect him to become a priest, but to take charge of the family business since he was his only son. Father Fortea acknowledges that up until his adolescence, religion lacked importance for him and that the concept of sin seemed to be an anachronism. He valued the Church on the same level of Greek Mythology. During that period of time, he had in mind to pursue studies in law school. However, when he turned 15 years old, his perspective had a radical change and, in his own words, he understood that "he was a sinner and that the Church was the truth." He attributed this change to a grace from God. The same year, he finds himself considering the possibility of becoming a priest. After looking for guidance into this new path, he took the advice of a priest who told him to join the seminary, just to rule out any doubt. Upon entering the seminary, he clearly understood that the priesthood was his calling.

He then got a bachelor's degree in Theology at the University of Navarra and his master's degree in the University of Comillas. Even though his specialty in Theology was on History of the Church, his licentiate thesis was about the topic of exorcism, hence the title "Exorcism in the Present Age". The result of those investigations was published under the titled "Daemoniacum". That publication made him known for the first time in Spain. Years later, and with a greater scope of knowledge in the topic, Summa Daemoniaca was published. This book was followed by a supplemental publication called Exorcística which provides new theoretical resources and practical cases.

In 2011, he travelled to Europe and South America with Norwegian documentary filmmaker Fredrik Horn Akselsen to make Eksoristen i det 21. århundre (The Exorcist in the 21st Century)secolo), a documentary that shows Fortea grappling with exorcisms, first aired on NRK TV in 2012.

== Publications ==
Father Fortea’s most famous publication is Summa Daemoniaca. That book is a treatise of demonology and an exorcist’s manual. The book analyzes the world of demons, the final damnation state of the soul, the inter-relationship of the fallen angels among themselves and with respect to angels, human beings and God. The book’s second part deals with the different related demonic phenomena: how to discern if someone’s possessed, how to conduct an exorcism, the poltergeist phenomenon in haunted houses, as well as some other strange and unusual phenomena. That book ends with an analysis about evil itself. The "reflections" at the end of the book constitute the most philosophical part of the treaty.

The book Exorcistica is a supplemental publication of Summa Daemoniaca. It is as extensive as the book it supplements: this second treaty embraces with a deeper understanding the topics discussed in the first book. The book, titled Anneliese Michel, a Case of Possession, analyzes the case of a German girl who died in 1976 after undergoing a number of exorcisms. In A Mysterious God, the question about charismatic gifts is analyzed as well.

Fr. Fortea has been prolific in regards to exploring the literature field. In fact, he wrote a novel series regarding the book of Apocalipse called "Decalogia or Saga of Apocalipse" which is a cycle of ten novels about the end of the world, explained over and over again from a series of different perspectives. The following is a complete list of his publications classified by genres: Decalogia or Saga of the Apocalipse: Ciclus Apocalypticus (2005) Historia de la II Secesión de los Estados Unidos de América (2005) La Construcción del Jardín del Edén (2005) Memoirs of the Last Templar Master: Anno Domini 2211 (2005) The Judgement (2005) Necronerópolis (2005) Línea Trocaica (2005) Goedia (2005) Book Nine: Abstracts from the Revelation Era (2005) Book Ten: Abstracts from the Revelation Era (2005) Edipo Vasco - Libros Libres, 2004. ISBN 84-96088-29-4 Obra Férrea - Editorial Dos Latidos, Benasque 2004, ISBN 978-84-933788-1-3

Dogmatic Theology Daemoniacum: a Demonology Treaty - Belacqua, Barcelona 2002 ISBN 84-95894-09-2 Summa Daemoniaca - Dos Latidos, S.L.U, 2004 ISBN 84-933788-2-8 ISBN 978-84-933788-2-0 Exorcística. 2007. Anneliese Michelle, a Case of Possession - Editorial Polwen. Polonia, 2011. A Mysterious God - Editorial Dos Latidos. Benasque 2010.

Other Works Eimeric, Nicolau: Manual de Inquisidores - La Esfera de los Libros S.L. Traducción y prólogo de J.A. Fortea. Memoirs of an Exorcist - Editorial Martínez Roca. 2008. ISBN 978-84-270-3483-9

=== Novel ===
- Decalogía o Saga del Apocalipsis:
  - Cyclus Apocalypticus (2005)
  - Historia de la segunda secesión de los Estados Unidos (2005)
  - La construcción del Jardín del Edén (2005)
  - Memorias del último gran maestre templario. Año del señor 2211 (2005)
  - El juicio (2005)
  - Necronerópolis (2005)
  - Línea trocaica (2005)
  - Goedia (2005)
  - Libro noveno. Fragmentos de la época del Apocalipsis (2005)
  - Libro décimo. Fragmentos de la época del Apocalipsis (2005)
- Edipo Vasco, Libros Libres, 2004. ISBN 84-96088-29-4
- Obra Férrea Editorial Dos Latidos, Benasque 2004, ISBN 978-84-933788-1-3

=== Dogmatic Theology ===
- Daemoniacum. Tratado de demonología. Belacqua, Barcelona 2002 ISBN 84-95894-09-2
- Summa Daemoniaca. Dos Latidos, S.L.U, 2004 ISBN 84-933788-2-8 ISBN 978-84-933788-2-0
- Exorcística. Cuestiones sobre el demonio, la posesión y el exorcismo, 2007.
- Anneliese Michel, un caso de posesión, Editorial Polwen. Polonia, 2011.
  - José Antonio Fortea, Lawrence E.U. LeBlanc, Anneliese Michel : a true story of a case of demonic possession : Germany 1976, self-published, 2012. OCLC 1249445957
- Un Dios Misterioso, Editorial Dos Latidos. Benasque 2010.

=== Other works ===
- Eimeric, Nicolau: Manual de Inquisidores La Esfera de los Libros S.L. Traducción y prólogo de J.A. Fortea.
- Memorias de un Exorcista, Editorial Martínez Roca. 2008. ISBN 978-84-270-3483-9
