= Vos estis lux mundi =

2019 motu proprio by Pope Francis

Vos estis lux mundi Latin for 'You are the light of the world' Apostolic letter of Pope Francis
- Signature date: 7 May 2019
- Text: In English

Vos estis lux mundi ('You are the light of the world') is a motu proprio by Pope Francis, promulgated on 9 May 2019. It establishes new procedural norms to combat sexual abuse and ensure that bishops and religious superiors are held accountable for their actions. It establishes universal norms, which apply to the whole church. As an experiment, the norms entered into force for a period of three years, starting on 1 June 2019. The norms were then expanded and made permanent on 25 March 2023, with their coming into force on 30 April 2023.

In its preamble, Pope Francis affirms that:

The crimes of sexual abuse offend Our Lord, cause physical, psychological and spiritual damage to the victims and harm the community of the faithful. In order that these phenomena, in all their forms, never happen again, a continuous and profound conversion of hearts is needed, attested by concrete and effective actions that involve everyone in the Church, [...] Therefore, it is good that procedures be universally adopted to prevent and combat these crimes that betray the trust of the faithful.

The document was issued three months after the sexual abuse summit convened by Pope Francis at the Vatican in February 2019.

== History ==
The law became effective for a three-year experimental period (ad experimentum), coming into force on 1 June 2019. On 25 March 2023, Pope Francis published a decree which made it so a new version of Vos estis lux mundi and its laws would become permanent on 30 April of the same year. The new version contains the same norms as in the 2019 version, but with their scope broadened to include investigations of lay leaders in international associations of the faithful.

== Crimes covered ==
The new norms apply to the crimes of:

- sexual abuse, both of minors and adults, when committed by violence or threat or through abuse of authority;
- sexual abuse of minors under 18 years of age;
- sexual abuse of vulnerable persons, understood as "any person in a state of infirmity, physical or mental deficiency, or deprivation of personal liberty which, in fact, even occasionally, limits their ability to understand or to want or otherwise resist the offence";
- the production, exhibition, possession or distribution of child pornography;
- the recruitment of or inducement of a minor or a vulnerable person to participate in pornographic exhibitions.

when committed by clerics (bishops, priests or deacons) or by members of institutes of consecrated life and societies of apostolic life (religious brothers or sisters), as well as the cover-up of such crimes, when committed by a bishop or by a supreme moderator of a religious congregation.

The norms contained in Vos estis lux mundi are procedural in nature, setting up a reporting system. The motu proprio does not introduce new penalties. The crimes are therefore to be punished in accordance with existing canon provisions.

According to J. D. Flynn:

The document establishes that a broad swath of sexual acts committed by clerics with adults are potentially canonical crimes, and should be treated as such, if they involve "abuses of authority" or "vulnerable persons," a term it defines to broadly include those who are limited in "their ability to understand or to want or to otherwise resist the offense." This is a meaningful development of the Church's law, which has not previously recognized explicitly that implied coercion, abuse of authority, and imbalances of power can render seemingly consensual sexual acts as crimes.

== Diocesan reporting mechanisms ==
The law mandates that each diocese in the world sets up, by June 2020, "one or more public, stable and easily accessible systems for submission of reports" concerning sexual abuse. As noted by Andrea Tornielli, "the legislation does not specify what these "systems" consist of, because it leaves operational choices to the diocese; and these may differ according to various cultures and local conditions".

== Reporting obligations ==
The law mandates that clerics and religious report to ecclesiastical authority whenever they have "notice of, or well-founded motives to believe that" some sexual abuse or cover-up has been committed. In addition, Vos estis lux mundi encourages all laypersons to report clerical sexual abuse and its cover-up to the competent ecclesiastical authorities.

Vos estis lux mundi does not require clerics to report to civil authorities. However, it underlines that the obligation to report to the ecclesiastical authority does not interfere with, nor change, any reporting obligation that may exist in each countries’ legislation. Pursuant to article 19, the norms "apply without prejudice to the rights and obligations established in each place by state laws, particularly those concerning any reporting obligations to the competent civil authorities".

== Reports against bishops and lay involvement ==
If there is an allegation against one of the suffragan bishops in an ecclesiastical province that is not manifestly false, the metropolitan archbishop will conduct an investigation with a mandate of the Holy See. If the metropolitan himself is the accused, the report is handled by the bishop of the suffragan diocese with the greatest seniority of appointment. Thereafter, the metropolitan or the person in charge of the investigation sends the Holy See, every thirty days, a status report on the preliminary investigation, which normally should be completed within ninety days.

In conducting the investigations, the metropolitan can avail himself of the help of qualified persons, both lay and clerical, according to "the needs of the individual case and, in particular, taking into account the cooperation that can be offered by the lay faithful" even if the ultimate responsibility for investigations remains with the metropolitan. To facilitate this task, episcopal conferences and dioceses may prepare lists of qualified persons willing to collaborate in the investigations.

At the conclusion of the investigation, the metropolitan forwards the results to the competent Vatican dicastery, which will then proceed "in accordance with the law provided for the specific case," acting on the basis of already existing canonical norms. If necessary, on the basis of the preliminary investigation, the Holy See can immediately impose restrictive measures on the person under investigation.

If the metropolitan or the bishop responsible for the investigation executes it poorly, he himself could be investigated for cover-up.

The canon lawyer J. D. Flynn has observed that:

Notably, the document also applies to bishops accused of interfering with or avoiding criminal and canonical investigations of sexual abuse or coercion. And it clarifies that compliance with civil law is a normative expectation for bishops, and that failing to do so could lead to censure. This far exceeds the prevailing cultural paradigm in many parts of the world, but it is in line with what Pope Francis has said about cooperation with civil authorities for years.

== Protection for the accused, victims, and whistleblowers ==
Pursuant to art. 4, whoever reports a case of sexual abuse or coverup cannot be subjected to "prejudice, retaliation or discrimination" because of what they report. Moreover, the reporter and the victims cannot be required to keep silence about the facts. Vos estis lux mundi also provides that the victims and their families must be treated with dignity and respect, must be welcomed, listened to and supported, and must be offered appropriate spiritual, medical and psychological assistance. However, the innocence of the accused must be presumed and the accused must be given the chance to defend him/herself and to receive legal counsel.

== Reactions ==
According to Cardinal Daniel DiNardo, President of the United States Conference of Catholic Bishops (2016–2019):

We [the US bishops] receive the Motu Proprio Vos estis lux mundi ('You are the light of the world') as a blessing that will empower the Church everywhere to bring predators to justice, no matter what rank they hold in the Church. It also permits the Church the time and opportunity to bring spiritual healing.

According to Cardinal Seán Patrick O'Malley, President of the Pontifical Commission for the Protection of Minors:

During the past year it has become far more clear that the people of the Church and our wider society rightfully demand substantive action for disclosure, transparency, and accountability with regard to any occurrence of sexual abuse, or intimidation, or cover up in the life of the Church and that that all Church personnel, regardless of office, be subject to the same policies, procedures, and sanctions. Vos estis lux mundi is an important and substantive response to that demand. I am grateful to the Holy Father [Pope] for his recognition of the critical need for these new policies and procedures and his actions to as best possible assure the protection of all the people we serve throughout the world.

According to the canonist Kurt Martens:

This new law is without a doubt a rare gift to the entire church and sets, along with the companion Vatican law providing for jail time for any public official of the Vatican who fails to report abuse, an unmistakable new course. The painful, sometimes bitter, experience of the church in the United States and the voices of the faithful worldwide have helped bring about a change in attitude and a change in law. There is no turning back now, and the tone has been set for the future.

In an official statement, the Survivors Network of those Abused by Priests noted some positive elements in Vos estis lux mundi but considered it lacking, particularly regarding the reporting obligations to civil authorities:

Mandated reporting is a good thing. Yet while this new law will compel priests and nuns to report abuse, it requires them to do so internally, to the very Church structures and offices that have been receiving and routing allegations of abuse for years. We would have been far more impressed if this new law required church officials to report to police and prosecutors instead. ... While we remain skeptical of this new law, we recognize some good things within it. For example, we are glad that the Vatican is specifically recognizing the plight of vulnerable adults by acknowledging "the abuse of authority," regardless of a victim's age. We are also glad that the Vatican has pledged to move quickly on internal investigations.

== See also ==
- Pascite gregem Dei
