= Massimo Faggioli =

Italian Church historian

Massimo Faggioli (born 1970) is an Italian academic, Church historian, expert on Vatican II, and professor of historical theology at Villanova University, columnist for Global Catholic, and contributing writer to Commonweal.

== Career ==
Massimo Faggioli received his B.A. and M.A. from the University of Bologna in Italy in 1994. He worked in the John XXIII Foundation for Religious Studies in Bologna between 1996 and 2008 and received his Ph.D. from the University of Turin in 2002.

He was on the faculty at the University of St. Thomas (St. Paul, Minnesota) from 2009 to 2016, where he was the founding director of the Institute for Catholicism and Citizenship. During this time, Faggioli was the founding co-chair (2012–2017) of the study group "Vatican II Studies" for the American Academy of Religion. In 2017 and 2018 he was an adjunct professor at the Broken Bay Institute, part of the Australian Institute of Theological Education in Sydney, Australia. Since 2016 he is a full professor in the Department of Theology and Religious Studies at Villanova University (Philadelphia). In the academic year 2025-2026 he was on the faculty at the Loyola Institute at Trinity College Dublin. He writes for newspapers and journals on the Church, religion and politics, has written, or (co-)edited numerous books, and gives public lectures on the Church and on Vatican II.

His Annual Cardinal Joseph Bernardin Lecture was given at the University of South Carolina on 7 October 2013 and published in America on 24 February 2014 issue, focussing on the relationship between Catholics and politics.

Since November 2014 he has been columnist for La Croix International (formerly Global Pulse Magazine, recently Global Catholic), and since 2016 for Commonweal magazine. Since 2016 he is staff writer for the Italian Catholic magazine "Il Regno".

In 2018 he received from Sacred Heart University (Connecticut, USA) an honorary doctorate in theology.

In 2023 he was elected in the editorial board of Concilium: International Journal of Theology.

Faggioli is a member of the steering committee for the project “Vatican II: Event and Mandate” for a twelve-volume, intercontinental commentary of Vatican II.

He is co-editor with Bryan Froehle of the series "Studies in Global Catholicism" for Brill Publishers (first volume in 2024).

Faggioli's research interests include extreme conservatism within American Catholicism as well as integralism.

== Select publications ==
- Il vescovo e il concilio. Modello episcopale e aggiornamento al Vaticano II, Il Mulino, Bologna 2005, 476 pp.
- Breve storia dei movimenti cattolici, Carocci, Roma 2008, 146 pp. (Spanish translation: Historia y evolución de los movimientos católicos. De León XIII a Benedicto XVI, Madrid: PPC Editorial, 2011, pp. 224)
- Vatican II: The Battle for Meaning, New York/Mahwah, NJ, Paulist Press 2012, pp. 207 (Italian translation: Interpretare il Vaticano II. Storia di un dibattito, Bologna, EDB, 2013, 160 pp.; Portuguese translation: Vaticano II. A luta pelo sentido, translated by Jaime A. Clasen, São Paulo, Editora Paulinas Brasil, 2013, 216 pp.)
- True Reform. Liturgy and Ecclesiology in Sacrosanctum Concilium, Collegeville MN, Liturgical Press 2012, pp. 188 (Italian translation: Vera riforma. Liturgia ed ecclesiologia nel Vaticano II, Bologna, EDB, 2013, 192 pp.; German translation: Sacrosanctum Concilium. Der Schlüssel zum Zweiten Vatikanischen Konzil, Freiburg i.B., Herder, 2015).
- Nello spirito del concilio. Movimenti ecclesiali e recezione del Vaticano II, Cinisello B.: San Paolo, 2013, 160 pp.
- Papa Francesco e la “chiesa-mondo”, Roma, Armando Editore, 2014, 96 pp.
- Pope John XXIII. The Medicine of Mercy, Collegeville MN, Liturgical Press, 2014, 160 pp.
- Sorting Out Catholicism. Brief History of the New Ecclesial Movements, Collegeville MN, Liturgical Press, 2014, 224 pp.
- Pope Francis. Tradition in Transition, New York, Paulist Press, 2015, 104 pp.
- A Council for the Global Church. Receiving Vatican II in History, Minneapolis, Fortress Press, 2015, 350 pp.
- The Legacy of Vatican II, eds. Massimo Faggioli and Andrea Vicini SJ, New York, Paulist Press, 2015, 320 pp.
- The Rising Laity. Ecclesial Movements since Vatican II, New York, Paulist Press, 2016, 176 pp.
- Catholicism and Citizenship. Political Cultures of the Church in the 21st Century, Collegeville MN, Liturgical Press, 2017, 165 pp.
- Cattolicesimo, nazionalismo, cosmopolitismo. Chiesa, società e politica dal Vaticano II a papa Francesco, Roma, Armando Editore, 2018, 176 pp.
- The Liminal Papacy of Pope Francis. Moving Toward Global Catholicity, Maryknoll NY: Orbis Books, 2020, 210 pp. (translated also in Italian).
- Joe Biden e il cattolicesimo negli Stati Uniti, Brescia: Morcelliana, 2021, 208 pp. (translated also in English and in French).
- The Oxford Handbook of Vatican II, eds. Catherine Clifford and Massimo Faggioli, Oxford: Oxford University Press, 2023, 777 pp.
- Theology and Catholic Higher Education. Beyond Our Identity Crisis, Maryknoll: Orbis Books, 2024, 192 pp.
- (co-authored with Bryan Froehle) Global Catholicism: Between Disruption and Encounter (series Studies in Global Catholicism, 1) Leiden: Brill, 2024, XIII + 310 pp.
- Da Dio a Trump. Crisi cattolica e politica americana, Brescia: Morcelliana, 2025, 240 pp. (also in Croatian).
- Leo XIV and the Global Church. Unity and Peace, Collegeville: Liturgical Press, 2026, 300 pp. (also in Italian).

== Awards ==
- 2017 “Jerome Award” of the Catholic Library Association, for outstanding contribution and commitment to excellence in scholarship.
- "Yves Congar Award for Theological Excellence" from Barry University in Miami, Florida on 24 January 2019.
- 2023 recipient of the “Chaire Francqui” awarded by the Francqui Foundation (Belgium) for the Fall semester 2023 at the Université Catholique de Louvain (Louvain-la-Neuve)
