= Camilo Estévez =

Camilo Estévez may refer to:

- Camilo Estévez (bishop) (died 1999), Spanish bishop of the Palmarian Catholic Church
- Camilo Estévez (handball) (born 1970), Puerto Rican handball coach
