= Palmarian Catholic Church =

Christian church in Andalusia, Spain

Coordinates: 37°03′23″N 5°48′32″W

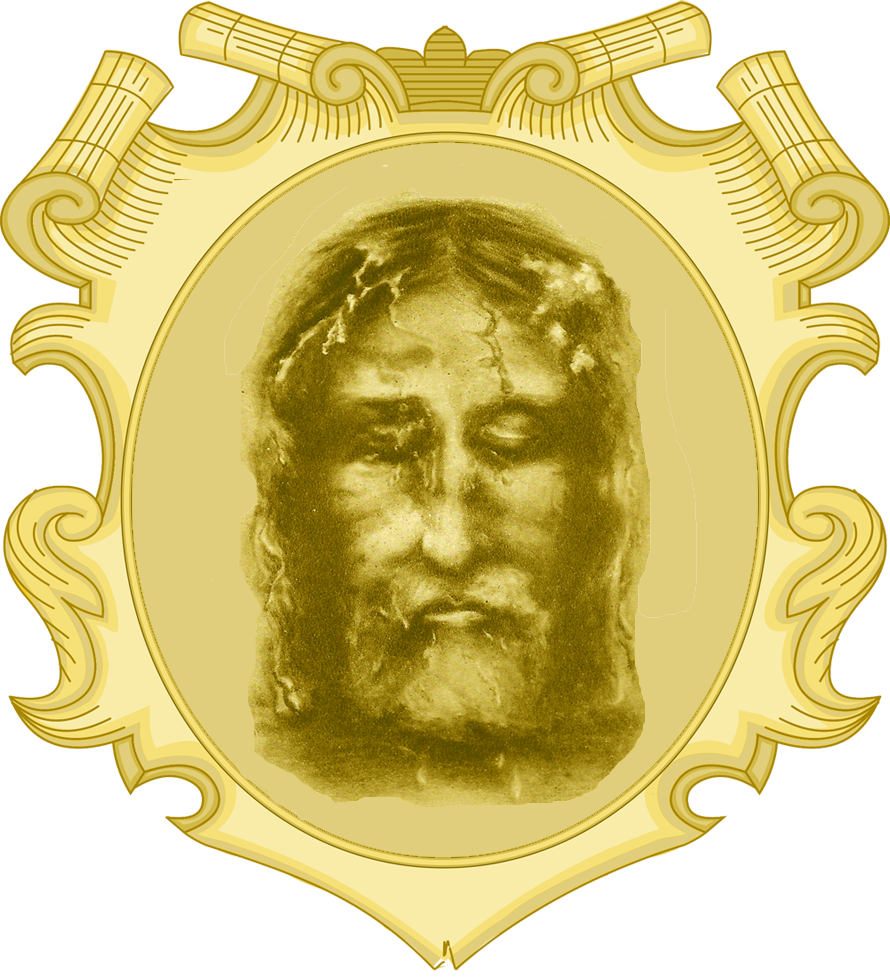
Palmarian Catholic Church
- Spanish: Iglesia Católica Palmariana
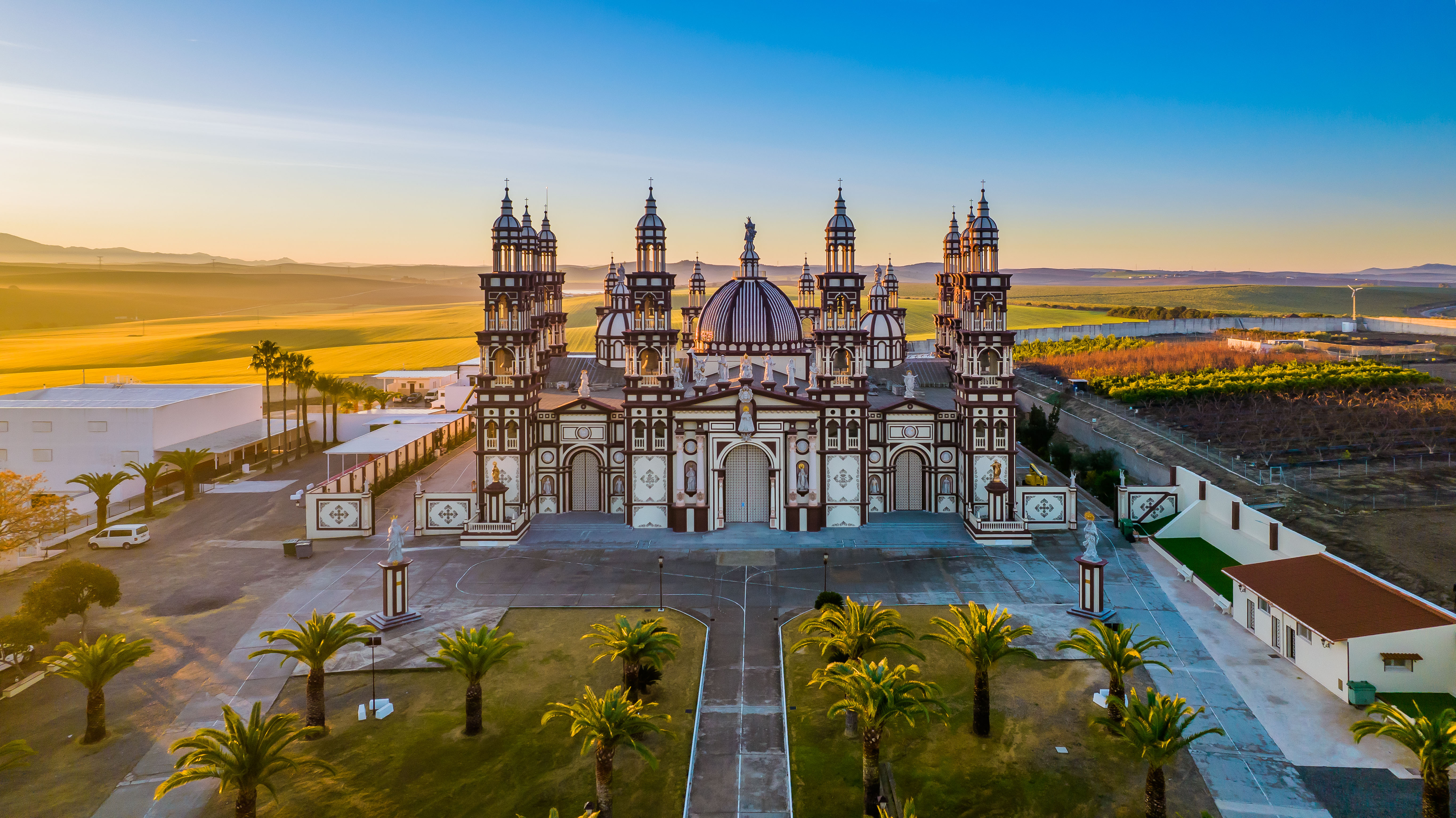
- The Cathedral-Basilica of Our Crowned Mother of Palmar, which the Palmarian Church considers the present headquarters of the Holy See of the Catholic Church
- Classification: Catholic (Independent)
- Orientation: Marian Apocalyptic / Mysticalist
- Scripture: The Sacred History or Holy Palmarian Bible
- Polity: Papal supremacy Episcopal
- Governance: Holy See of El Palmar de Troya
- Pope: Peter III
- Region: Andalusia, Spain
- Language: Latin (liturgical), Spanish
- Liturgy: Palmarian Rite
- Headquarters: Cathedral-Basilica of Our Crowned Mother of Palmar, El Palmar de Troya; Andalusia, Spain
- Founder: Jesus Christ (claims to be the legitimate Catholic Church); Pope Gregory XVII (first Palmarian Pope after alleged "Roman apostasy")
- Origin: 6 August 1978; Andalusia, Spain
- Separated from: Roman Catholic Church
- Congregations: 1 (with other missions)
- Members: 1,000 to 1,500 (claimed, 2011)
- Clergy: Bishops: 30; Nuns: 30 (2015)
- Other names: Palmarian Church; Palmarian Christian Church
- Official website: palmarianchurch.org

The Palmarian Catholic Church (Spanish: Iglesia Católica Palmariana), officially registered as the Palmarian Christian Church and also known as the Palmarian Church, is a Christian church with an episcopal see in El Palmar de Troya, Andalusia, Spain. The Palmarian Church claims to be the exclusive One, Holy, Catholic and Apostolic Church founded by Jesus Christ. It claims that the Holy See, the institution of the papacy and the headquarters of the Catholic Church was moved to El Palmar de Troya at the Cathedral-Basilica of Our Crowned Mother of Palmar, under the auspices of the Patriarchate of El Palmar de Troya, in 1978, due to the alleged apostasy of the Roman Catholic Church from the Catholic faith.

The origins of the Palmarians as a distinct body can be traced back to the alleged Marian apparitions of Our Lady of Palmar, which took place in Andalusia, Spain, from 1968 onward. Two men became particularly associated with this movement as time went on, Clemente Domínguez y Gómez and Manuel Alonso Corral. The former was known as a charismatic visionary and seer, while the latter the intellectual éminence grise. The messages of these visions were favourable to a traditionalist Catholic pushback to the liberalising changes introduced by the Second Vatican Council and alleged a Masonic infiltration of the Roman Catholic Church. In 1975, the Palmarians founded a religious order known as the Carmelites of the Holy Face and had a number of priests ordained, then consecrated as bishops by Archbishop Ngô Đình Thục, giving them holy orders. After the death of Pope Paul VI in 1978, Clemente Domínguez claimed that he had been mystically crowned pope of the Catholic Church by Jesus Christ and was to reign as Pope Gregory XVII from El Palmar de Troya.

Four subsequent Palmarian popes have reigned. Its current head since 2016 is Pope Peter III. Critical scholars, journalists and former followers often describe the organization as a religious cult. Members of the church are required to comply with a wide range of compulsory moral and behavioural standards known as the Norms, from strict modesty in dress, to restricted media consumption and limitations on social interaction with non-Palmarians, among many other rules. Non-compliance can lead to excommunication for members, which has led some Palmarians to engage in shunning of those who have either been expelled or apostatized from the Palmarian Church.

== Name ==
The official name of the Palmarian Church in the register of religious entities in the Kingdom of Spain is the Iglesia Cristiana Palmariana de los Carmelitas de la Santa Faz (English: Palmarian Christian Church of the Carmelites of the Holy Face). This is due to a legal process which began in 1980, when the church applied to the Spanish Ministry of Justice for the status of a recognised religion under the name Iglesia Católica, Apostólica y Palmariana, Orden Religiosa de los Carmelitas de la Santa Faz en Compañía de Jesús y María (English: Catholic, Apostolic and Palmarian Church, Religious Order of the Carmelites of the Holy Face in Company of Jesus and Mary). This was initially rejected in 1982 by the Director-General of Religious Affairs who said that the terms "Catholic", pope" and "cardinal" as used by the Palmarians bore "excessive resemblance" to those still used by the Roman Catholic Church; in addition, the Palmarians simply claimed that they were the Catholic Church. A few months later, they made a fresh application using the current official name with "Christian" instead of Catholic, while continuing to use terms such as the Holy Catholic Palmarian Church, the One, Holy, Catholic, Apostolic and Palmarian Church, the Palmarian Catholic Church and other variations in internal documents. The director-general again rejected the registration due to the changes only being "semantic", but the Palmarians finally pushed through their registration through the Supreme Court of Spain in 1987 using the current official name.

== History ==
=== Background ===
==== Marian apparitions, Spain and the Second Vatican Council ====
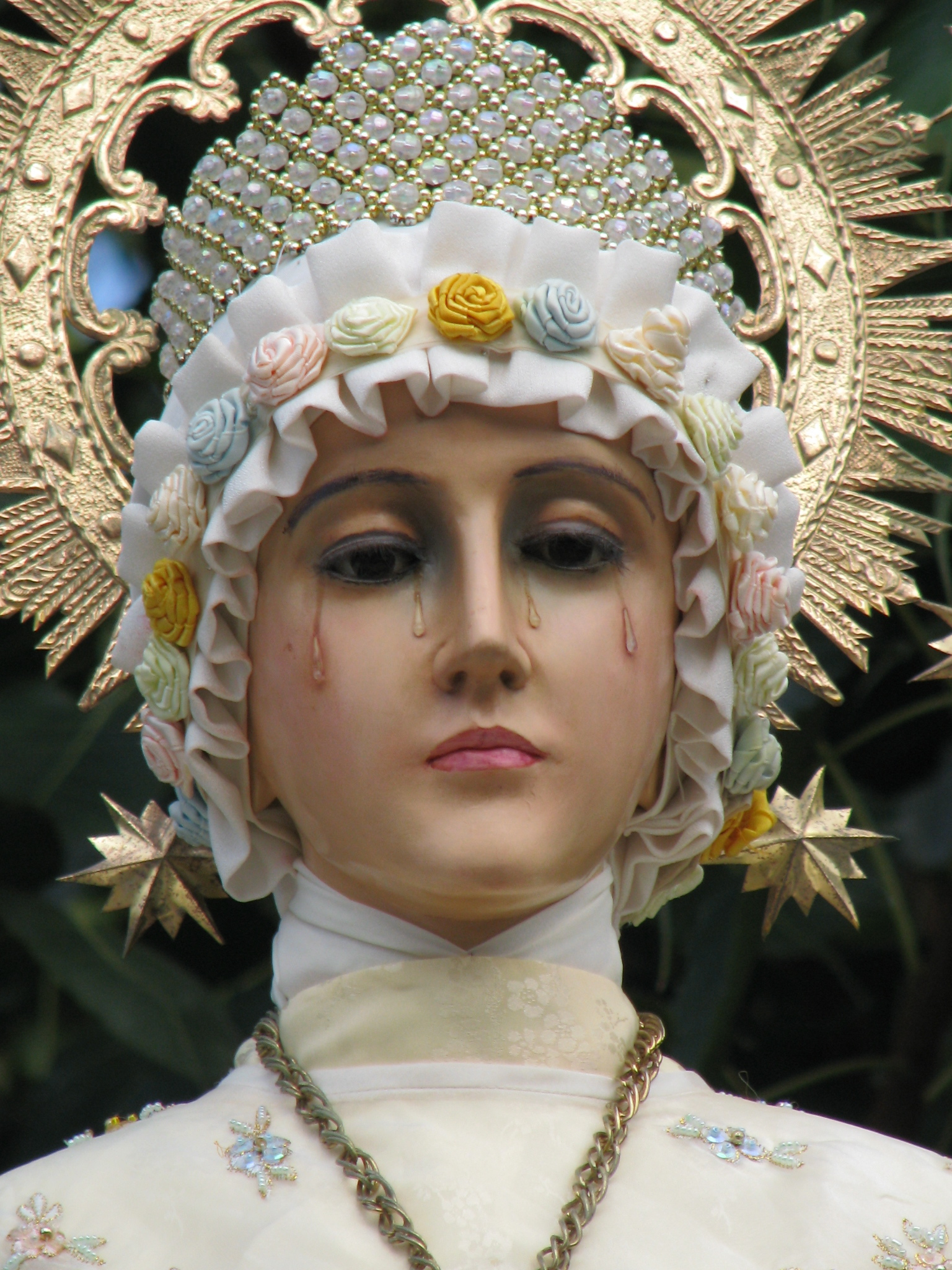
The Virgin Mary as she would have appeared as Our Lady of La Salette in 1846. This initiated a series of apocalyptic Marian apparitions, warning modern man of a coming great chastisement.

A series of Marian apparitions starting in the 19th century have led to what Magnus Lundberg calls Marian Apocalyptic Movements. These apparitions typically feature the Virgin Mary bearing an important eschatological message that warns humanity of a coming chastisement from God for its sinful behaviour and apostasy which will be followed by a period of peace and virtue for the faithful. When humanity then returns to its sinful ways, a more fearsome chastisement culminates in a final world war that marks the end of the world. Some of these apparitions have been investigated by the Catholic Church and declared worthy of belief and veneration. Palmarians regard several as important steps on the way to the appearance of Our Lady of Palmar, specifically those of La Salette (1846), Fátima (1917), Ezkioga (1931), Heroldsbach (1949), Ladeira do Pinheiro (1960), San Damiano (1961), and Garabandal (1961).

The apparitions of El Palmar de Troya took place in Spain at a time of religious and political upheaval, during the final decade that Francisco Franco was Caudillo of the Spanish State. The government had been established in the aftermath of the Spanish Civil War and during the war the nationalists identified themselves as engaged in a "Crusade against the Second Spanish Republic 1919-1939, international communism and freemasonry." Before and during the Spanish Civil War, many Catholic clerics were killed by the republican side and in some places the Catholic Church had to go underground. After victory, under Franco, National Catholicism was adopted in Spain, whereby Spanishness and Catholicism were presented as being inseparable. In the worldview of Francoism, Spain was a "providential nation, being a faithful Catholic bulwark against liberalism, Freemasonry, Protestantism and communism". Spain was a confessional state and this broadly had the support of the church; however, by the 1940s, there was some concerns about the power of the state subordinating the church and after the Second Vatican Council in the 1960s, the high episcopacy, particularly Cardinal Vicente Enrique y Tarancón began to push against Franco for "reforms" and the creation of a more modern state. This was not unanimous and some Spanish priests belonging to the Hermandad Sacerdotal Española backed Francoists against the new liberal-leaning line of the Spanish Episcopal Conference and the Vatican.

Following the Second Vatican Council, which took place between 1962 and 1965, there emerged a new openness to religious liberty, ecumenism, interreligious dialogue and on the back of it, introduced in 1969, a New Order of Mass. These changes scandalised traditionalists within the Catholic Church and an insurgent traditionalist Catholic movement emerged pushing back against this. Prominent early figures included Frenchmen such as Georges de Nantes, who founded the Ligue de la contre-réforme catholique and Archbishop Marcel Lefebvre who founded the Society of St. Pius X (which became by far the most prominent). The early Palmarian themes were a part of this milleu, with direct and indirect relationships with the traditionalist Catholic resistance worldwide, including the SSPX. According to Lundberg, traditionalists refused to believe that "a true Catholic hierarchy would make such changes, and saw modernist, masonic and communist conspiracies". A common traditionalist theme of decrying "infiltration", raised questions about the complicity of the Pope himself: Lefebvre diplomatically criticised Pope Paul VI, but still considered him a true Pope. At the opposite end, by 1971, sedevacantists emerged who claimed that Paul VI was a non-Catholic antipope leading a new heretical religion, an early example of which is Joaquín Sáenz y Arriaga.

==== Apparitions of Our Lady of Palmar and Devotion to the Holy Face ====
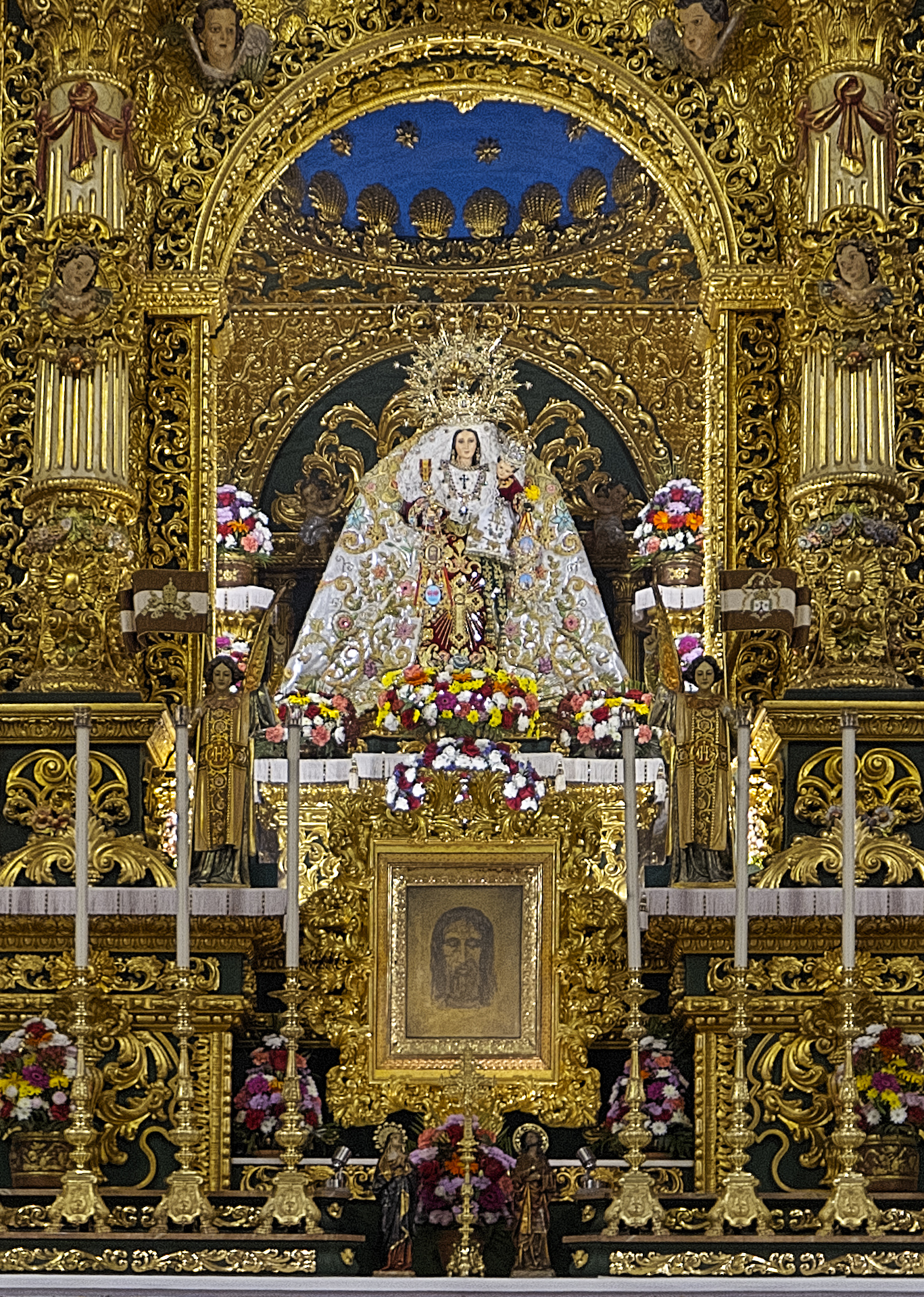
High altar of the Cathedral-Basilica of Our Crowned Mother of Palmar, depicting the Virgin Mary and the Holy Face of Jesus Christ. Based on alleged apparitions in 1969, devotion to the Virgin and the Holy Face would become prominent aspects of the Palmarians.

On 30 March 1968, four Spanish Catholic girls, aged 12 and 13—Ana García, Rafaela Gordo, Ana Aguilera and Josefa Guzmán—reported that the Virgin Mary had appeared to them in the field of La Alcaparroa farm, close to the village of El Palmar de Troya, which at that time was a district of the municipality of Utrera, in the province of Seville, Andalusia, Spain. On 11 April 1968, a devout Catholic woman named Rosario Arenillas reported seeing the Virgin Mary with the mantle of Our Lady of Mount Carmel in the same place. On 20 May 1968 a neighbor from Utrera named María Marín also said she had seen the Virgin in the same place. On 6 June 1968, María Luisa Vila from Seville went to the farm and said she had a mystical ecstasy in which Jesus Christ administered communion to her and, according to witnesses, when she opened her mouth there was a bloody host inside. In the summer of 1968, Antonio Romero, Manuel Fernández, José Navarro, Antonio Anillos and Arsenia Llanos also said they suffered mystical ecstasies there.

On 15 October 1968, Clemente Domínguez and Manuel Alonso Corral visited the site for the first time. Manuel "Manolo" Corral worked in an insurance brokerage that Serafín Madrid used to finance his charitable works. When Corral became involved in the situation at Palmar de Troya he was expelled from the insurance company (belief in the apparitions were strongly opposed by José Bueno y Monreal, Archbishop of Seville, who refused to examine the seers or even open up any enquiries). On 15 August 1969, the two men attended a Holy Mass celebrated by a Jesuit priest there and during it María Luisa Vila said she had a vision of the Virgin (Josemaría Escrivá, founder of Opus Dei, drawn to mystical phenomenon, held a long interview with Vila who he had met previously at Jerez de la Frontera, Cádiz). Later they ran into María Marín and Nectario María who said they had a vision of Jesus Christ. After this point, Domínguez and Corral visited far more frequently. There they talked with the visionaries and witnessed their ecstasies and on 14 September 1969, both declared that they had an appearance of a luminous cross.

Statue of Padre Pio on a side altar in Palmar Cathedral.

On 30 September 1969, Rosario Arenillas and Domínguez said they had a vision of Jesus Christ and Padre Pio. A few days later María Luisa Vila declared that she had the same vision. On 8 December 1969, Domínguez claimed to have a vision in which the Virgin and the angels gave him a Dominican habit and on 10 December 1969, Domínguez said that Dominic de Guzmán had appeared to him to recommend praying the Rosary and the Pater Noster. On 10 December 1969 he also said that Joseph appeared to him. On 12 December 1969, Domínguez said he had another vision of Dominic and next to him he said he saw the Holy Face of Jesus. Then he said that Dominic had given him the message that he should expand devotion to the Holy Face, the Stations of the Cross and the reparative communion on the first Thursday of each month, to repair the outrages to the divine face of the Lord. Domínguez and Corral began to carry a portrait of the Holy Face for prayers in which ecstasy occurred.

Domínguez claimed to suffer stigmata of the Holy Wounds during his visions, such as a cross-shaped cut on his forehead and cuts on his hands. These visions and stigmata, according to Domínguez himself, also occurred in the boarding house in Seville where he lived. At one point he revealed a 10-centimeter cut on his side, which was a supposed stigmata, representing where Jesus Christ had been pierced in his side by Roman soldier Longinus with the Holy Lance. On 16 July 1970, a supposed Marian apparition told him that the waters from a well in the area were miraculous and that it produced healings. A mastic tree in the area became the main location associated with some of the visions and on 2 February 1970, the believers put a picture of the Holy Face on it (in Palmarian discourse this is called the "Sacred Place of the Lentisco"). A large number of people were drawn to El Palmar de Troya, with 40,000 people witnessing one of Domínguez' mystical ecstasies and his stigmata. On 2 February 1970 they put a photo of the Holy Face in the mastic and on 2 March 1972, an image of the Divina Pastora was blessed. The Virgin of Palmar was placed in the mastic on 12 September 1972. On 8 February 1971, there was a reported apparition of Jesus Christ in the mastic to encourage the faithful who gathered at the farm.

With the duo of Domínguez and Corral now the people most closely associated with visions at Palmar; the former the visionary stigmatist and the latter the one who wrote down, copied and distributed the information; they set about spreading the message far beyond Spain. The visions were translated into English, French and German languages and the newsletter, Ecos del Palmar, was published from Barcelona by supporter Jóse María Andreu Magri from 1972. In the early 1970s, as well as receiving donations from ordinary Catholic followers, they gained some substantial benefactors. Most notably, the Baroness de Castillo Chirel, then 90 years old, a devout Catholic woman who had been a follower of Garabandal, gave Domínguez and Corral a donation of 16 million pesatas in 1972 (worth roughly €1.8 million in 2023). As part of their quest to spread the message, throughout the 1970s the duo travelled throughout Spain and Western Europe—often joined by their ally, Carmelo Pacheco Sánchez (1948–1997)—before eventually making annual trips across the Atlantic to Latin America and the United States. The traffic was not all one-way, as pilgrims came to visit El Palmar de Troya from many different countries in the Catholic world, with Irish people and German-speaking people (Germans, Austrians and Swiss people) being overrepresented.

They went to Rome several times, first on 8 July 1970, where Clemente jumped over a barrier, avoiding the Swiss Guard, to kneel before a procession of Pope Paul VI and present a letter (taken by a priest). Corral claimed later the Palmarians met with Cardinal Alfredo Ottaviani who informed Paul VI. Earlier, on 27 December 1969, they attempted to deliver a letter to the Spanish head of state, Francisco Franco, asking him to read a secret from God to the Spanish nation as part of his end-of-year speech. The duo turned up at El Pardo unannounced and, as ad hoc meetings were not accepted, they were instead directed to deliver their letter to Franco's private secretariat in the Palacio de Oriente. Stopping off to pray at a Carmelite church on the way, Domínguez had a vision of the Virgin Mary who told him he had been deceived by the devil and to not deliver the letter. Another substantial benefactor, gained during their trips to the United States, was the business woman Marguerite Mary Paul (1921–2001) from Necedah, Wisconsin and her husband. (Note: Although compared to their presence in Europe and Latin America (as well as later Africa), the Palmarian following in the United States was modest in terms of numbers, they had a localised spike in Wisconsin. In 1949, at Necedah there had been Marian apparitions witnessed by Mary Ann Van Hoof (1909–1984), which the Vatican did not accept. Thus a groundwork had been prepared before the Palmarians arrived in the town. The Necedah Shrine, known officially as Queen of the Holy Rosary, Mediatrix of Peace Shrine, exists in the town.) By 1974 Domínguez and Corral were able to purchase the 15,000 square meter plot of land at La Alcaparroa. Following an alleged apparition of Jesus Christ on 30 May 1975, the devotees of Palmar were requested to construct a sanctuary at La Alcaparroa. Along with the money from donors, a loan was taken out from the Central Bank of Utrera in the name Francisco González, Carlos Girón and Manuel Alonso.

==== Foundation of the Carmelites of the Holy Face ====
Coat of arms of the Carmelites of the Holy Face, in common with historical usage by Carmelites.

Although there were a few ordained priests of the Roman Catholic Church who were supporters of Our Lady of Palmar and the direction taken by Domínguez and Corral, the majority of those associated with the movement were at that point laymen, as were most of the pilgrims. The nucleus of an organisation began to develop through cenacles (prayer-groups), where the participants referred to themselves as Marian Apostles, or Apostles of the Cross (also Cross Bearers). On 30 November 1975, just ten days after the death of Spanish head of state, Francisco Franco, Domínguez claimed to have a vision of Jesus Christ and the Virgin Mary, announcing that a new religious order would be founded by the Palmarians. This order would be a synthesis of "the best" elements of all previous Catholic religious orders and they were to be the "Apostles of the Last Times" (a reference to the prophecies of Louis de Montfort, a noted Mariologist). With Domínguez himself as General, the order was revealed to the world as the Order of the Carmelites of the Holy Face on 22 December 1975. It was announced that it would have three classes; friars (for the priests and brothers), religious sisters and tertiaries (i.e. — laypeople), each wearing a Carmelite habit and a brown scapular, with the images of the Holy Face of Jesus and Our Lady of Palmar.

A major issue that facing the order at the beginning was that it wished to have more ordained priests and indeed consecrated bishops (both Domínguez and Corral wanted this for themselves in particular, as they were officially laymen). They could not rely on the assistance of the local ordinary, Cardinal José Bueno y Monreal, of the Archdiocese of Seville, due to his blanket opposition to anything to do with El Palmar de Troya. Nevertheless, it was ideologically important for the Carmelites of the Holy Face, to receive legitimate holy orders using the old rite of ordination, from a verifiable bishop of the Catholic Church with (in the Catholic view) undoubted apostolic succession, in communion with Pope Paul VI. The most visible bishop publicly associated with traditionalists was Archbishop Marcel Lefebvre of the Society of St. Pius X and the Palmarians had a significant sympathiser within the society, in the form of Maurice Revaz, (Note: Revaz, interested in mythical theories, shared the same belief as the Palmarians on the status of Pope Paul VI: not only was he a true Pope, but a great victim soul, who was being held hostage in the Vatican by the freemasons who had supposedly infiltrated the Curia. In this conspiratorial telling, these freemasons were supposedly drugging the Pope and in some cases forging his signature on heterodox documents, including for the New Mass. He even proposed to Lefebvre a "mission" to rescue the Pope, but this was dismissed.Lundberg 2020, p. 74) a canon of the Swiss Abbey of Grand-Saint-Bernard who was teaching at the International Seminary of Saint Pius X at Écône, Switzerland. Revaz asked Lefebvre if he would go to El Palmar de Troya for this purpose, but he declined, pointing them instead to the exiled Vietnamese Archbishop Ngô Đình Thục with the words "He is orthodox and he is not at present occupied. Go and seek him out. He will most certainly agree with your request."

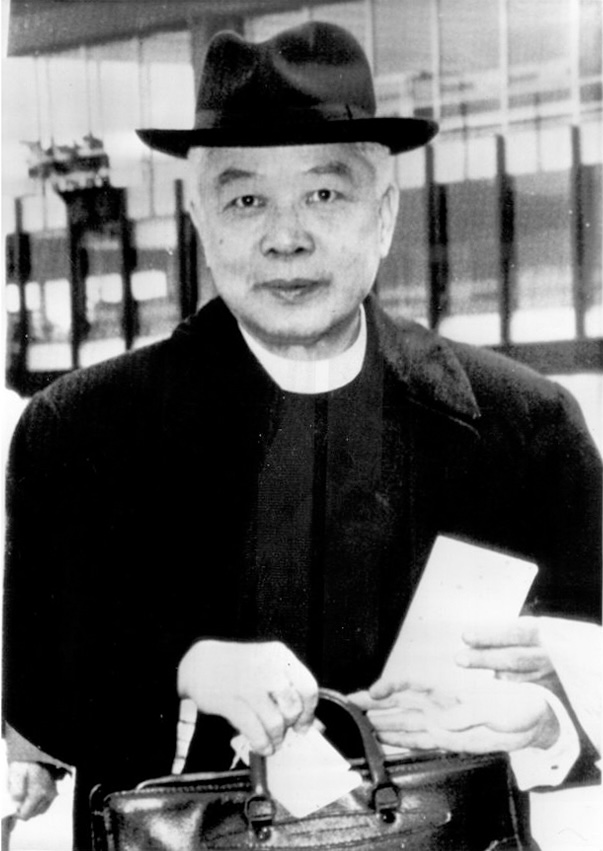
Archbishop Ngô Đình Thục, a prelate of the Catholic Church, ordained and then consecrated clergy for the Carmelites of the Holy Face in El Palmar de Troya.

Revaz, along with the McElligotts, an Irish Palmarian family who had property in Switzerland, drove from Switzerland to Rome to approach the Vietnamese archbishop. Revaz and Thục were already familiar with each other as they had both previously met as pilgrims to El Palmar de Troya in 1974. The background of Archbishop Ngô Đình Thục is that he was previously made the Archbishop of Huế, Vietnam by Pope John XXIII, but due to the 1963 South Vietnamese coup d'état which killed several close members of his family, he was living in exile in Rome. In 1968, Paul VI had made him the Titular Archbishop of Bulla Regia. Outraged by the murder of his relatives and deeply anti-communist, he was in good standing in Rome but increasingly disillusioned with their "diplomatic" approach to communism and started to draw closer to traditionalism in his exile. Revaz convinced Thục that the Virgin Mary sent him to render her a service and that they must leave immediately to Andalusia, he agreed and the party took a three-day car journey to El Palmar de Troya and Thục was celebrating the Pontifical High Mass there with the Carmelites of the Holy Face by Christmas Eve 1975.

While in El Palmar de Troya, on 31 December 1975, without the permission of the local ordinary at Seville, Thục ordained five men of the Carmelites of the Holy Face to the priesthood, conferring holy orders on the two Spaniards; Clemente Domínguez (who took the religious name Ferdinand) and Manuel Alonso Corral (who took the religious name Isidore), the two Irishmen; Paul Gerald Fox (who took the religious name Abraham) and Francis Coll (who took the religious name Gabriel), as well as the Frenchman; Louis Henri Moullins (who took the religious name Zacarias). Following this, the now Father Ferdinand claimed to have a vision from the Virgin Mary declaring that the Carmelites of the Holy Face needed to have bishops consecrated and as proof of this an alleged miracle was performed, as she had placed the Infant Jesus in his hands (invisible to the human eye), which Domínguez then passed to Archbishop Thục, who supposedly felt the weight of the Infant in his hands and agreed to the consecrations. On 11 January 1976, in a five-hour ceremony through the night, Thục consecrated five Palmarians to the episcopacy, including two men who he had just ordained as priests (Domínguez and Corral), in addition to three priests who had previously been ordained to the priesthood by the Roman Catholic Church, before the visions of Our Lady of Palmar; Camilo Estévez Puga (1924–1997; a Spaniard also known as Leandro), Francis Bernard Sandler (1917–1992; an American Catholic convert from Rabbinic Judaism who was a Benedictine and had served as a parish priest in Sweden, also known as Fulgencio) and finally Michael Thomas Donnelly (1927–1982; an Irish priest from Belfast from the Company of Mary, who within two months left the Palmarians).

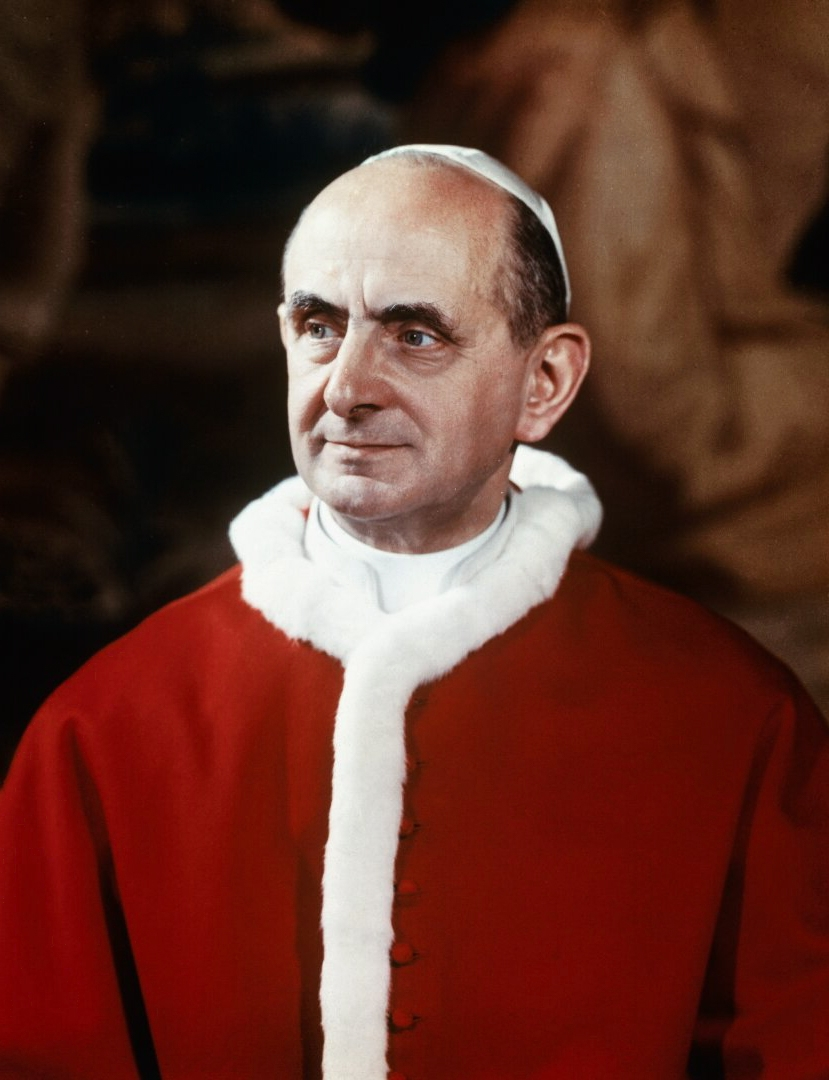
The Palmarians recognised Pope Paul VI as a true Pope, but claimed that he was a suffering victim soul for the church, held prisoner and drugged in the Vatican by Masonic infiltrators.

The Vatican, through first Cardinal Bueno, then their Nuncio to Spain Luigi Dadaglio and finally Franjo Šeper's Congregation for the Doctrine of the Faith, quickly moved against Thục and the Palmarians. They did not question the validity of the orders as such, but essentially declared that they were canonically illicit or irregular, due to not having permission, that they were ipso iure suspended from exercising their powers and ipso facto excommunicated. The Palmarians for their part, declared their loyalty to Pope Paul VI and argued that the claim of excommunication was illegitimate, claiming that in 1938, Pope Pius XI had granted Archbishop Thục the special power to ordain priests and bishops without requiring further permission. Regardless, in the eyes of the Palmarians, the Roman Curia was categorised as being packed with masonic infiltrators, who were supposedly drugging Pope Paul VI and holding him hostage in the Vatican. In relation to this, Domínguez had another vision in January 1976, where it is claimed Jesus Christ told him to consecrate more bishops and create an episcopal college for Pope Paul VI to come and govern the church from El Palmar de Troya. With Thục now fading into the background, the Palmarians under their own initiative between 1976 and 1978 had consecrated 91 additional bishops (mostly Irish and Spaniards, over 40% split almost evenly between these two nationalities, with the rest from mostly German-speaking Europe, as well as English, Nigerians, Argentines, Australians and many more different nations).

In May 1976, a major incident occurred while five Palmarian bishops were returning from a trip to Derval, Brittany, France, as there was a serious automobile crash in the Basque Country. The glass from the windshield shattered and went into the eyes of the General of the Order, Domínguez. Not only was he completely blinded by the incident, but the damage was such that he had to have his eyeballs surgically removed at San Sebastián hospital. The party had gone to Derval to deal with a crisis where a couple of Palmarian bishops there had gone across to the mystic, Pierre Poulain. According to the Palmarians, the devil attacked the car, after Poulain cast a black magic spell on his rival Domínguez. The Spanish media began to call him the "blind-seer." After months of silence, Domínguez reported a vision of Jesus Christ in September 1976, in which Christ is quoted as saying "No one should think that the palm-tree is lying down. It is more upright than ever because victory is found in the passion and crucifixion. Then comes the resurrection." Christ is then quoted as saying that he is preparing Domínguez to be a future Pope. God had thus allowed the blinding as a trial, a test of faith and a cross to bear, if he prevailed, he would prove himself worthy of the Papacy.

Pope Saint Paul VI lived in the Vatican surrounded by enemies, who acted as gaolers and tormentors. This holy Pope passed the days of his pontificate subjected to large doses of drugs, which were administered to him by his tormentors. These were cardinals, bishops, priests and so forth. Among these tormentors there stand out Cardinal Jean Villot, Cardinal Giovanni Benelli, Cardinal Sebastian Baggio, Cardinal Poletti,—and among others there also stands out Casaroli, of the Vatican's diplomatic service, the great traitor, who opened the gates for satanical dialogue with the Marxists. Pope Saint Paul VI is not guilty of the heresies introduced, since he was coerced and drugged. Also the holy Pontiff's signature was forged, and in addition, falsified documents were promulgated. The Masons and other infiltrated heretics in the Roman Curia reached the point of destroying the Catholic Mass, changing it and putting in its place the heretical Mass of the great Mason and traitor Bugnini.

We give guarantee and assurance, pledging Our word in the name of Christ, that the life of Pope Saint Paul VI was exemplary and virtuous. This holy Pope gave himself up completely to prayer and penance, and, of course, to continual self-sacrifice, his pontificate having been a sorrowful ascent to Calvary. This holy Pope was vilely murdered by the traitors of the Roman Curia.

— Pope Gregory XVII, Twenty-Fourth Document, 24 October 1978.

=== The Holy See at El Palmar de Troya ===
==== Reign of Pope Gregory XVII the Very Great ====
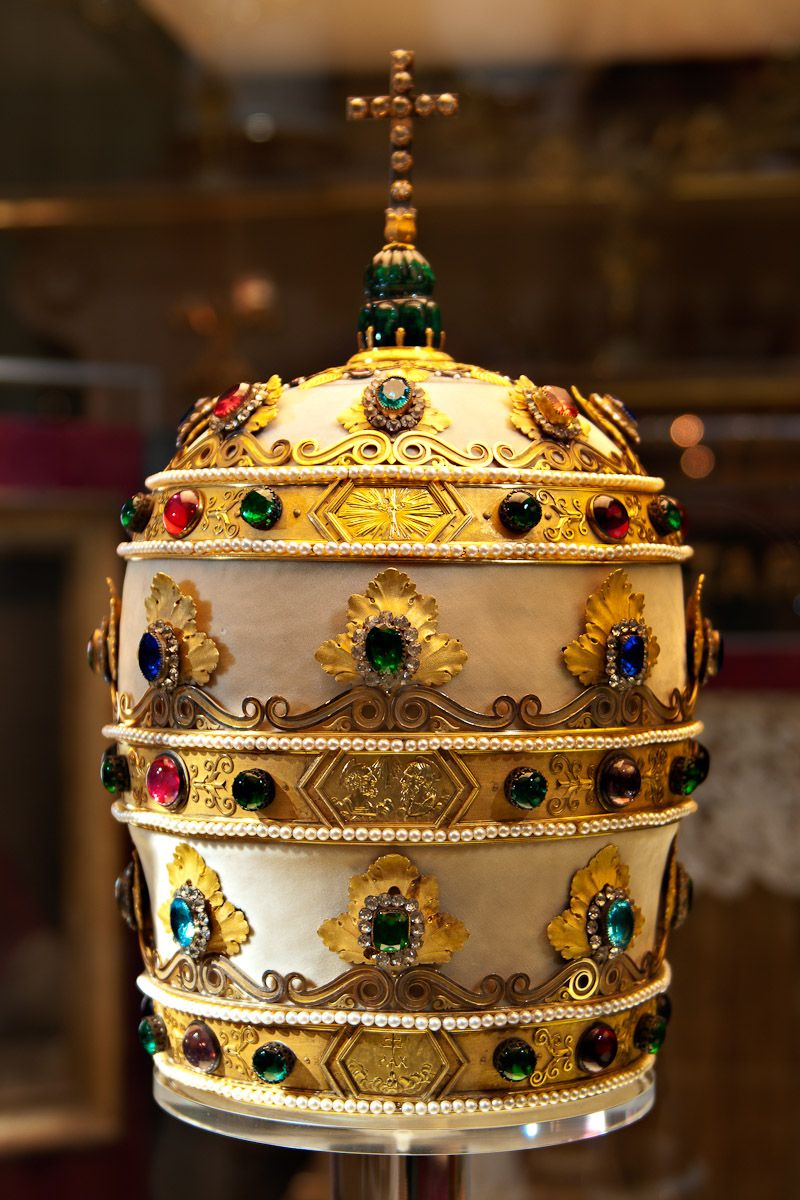
An example of a papal tiara. Clemente Domínguez claimed to have been mystically crowned Pope of the Catholic Church by Jesus Christ in an apparition. He took the name Pope Gregory XVII.

Pope Paul VI died on 6 August 1978 and according to the Palmarians (who consider him a Christian martyr), the Pope was supposedly "vilely murdered by the traitors of the Roman Curia" (specifically, they claim he was poisoned to death by Vatican Secretary of State, Cardinal Jean-Marie Villot). At the time of his passing, the General of the Order of the Carmelites of the Holy Face and other top Palmarian bishops, were in Bogotá, Colombia, as part of their regular trips across the Atlantic Ocean to see to their followers and attempt to recruit more clergy. While waiting to be deported from Colombia, a few hours after the death of Pope Paul VI, Domínguez reported an apparition, in which a mystical papal coronation ceremony took place, where he was crowned Sovereign Pontiff of the One, Holy, Catholic and Apostolic Church by Jesus Christ himself, with Peter and Paul in attendance, as well as the recently deceased Pope Paul VI. Although confessing to be but a poor sinner, from now on he would be referred to by Palmarian believers as Pope Gregory XVII and the Holy See of the Catholic Church would no longer be in Rome, but in El Palmar de Troya. The motto he took was Gloria Olivae, drawn from the Prophecy of the Popes, a Christian apocalyptic writing.

After returning to Seville, Domínguez held a consistory which selected a Palmarian College of Cardinals, with 24 Palmarian bishops raised to rank of Cardinal, including his close friend Corral. Having kept details of the "celestial" papal enthronement from the press, the public papal coronation ceremony took place on 15 August 1979, where four Palmarian cardinals (including Corral) placed the papal tiara on his head. Domínguez had claimed since the early 1970s that Pope Paul VI would be succeeded by a true Pope and an Antipope. Thus, when the Vatican declared Albino Luciani as the new Pope on 26 August 1978, he was portrayed in a Palmarian Papal pronouncement by Pope Gregory XVII as a usurper, "that clown of an Antipope, Cardinal Luciani, called John Paul I" with his "false smile". The Vatican for their part decided to inaugurate Luciani, instead of the traditional papal coronation. This supposed Vatican "Antipope" was in place for only a month before being replaced by Pope John Paul II. (In his Twenty-Fourth Document on 24 October 1978, Domínguez used his claimed authority to "excommunicate and anathematise the Antipope Cardinal Wojtyla", who is described as a "marxist spy" who infiltrated the church as a youth, stating in addition, "we hurl excommunication also at all followers of this Antipope"). The reigns of Pope Gregory XVII in El Palmar de Troya and John Paul II in the Vatican were closely synchronised, both lasting from 1978 until 2005. These Roman "Antipopes" were called precursors of the Antichrist by the Palmarians.

My son: now you can see how rotten and corrupt the official church, the Roman Church is. Through her fornication, she has become the Great Whore. It is she who is in pact with the enemies of Christ. It is she who respects all religions. It is she who preaches truths and lies at the same time. This Roman church is now nourished by a beast, the usurper John Paul II—the true church is no longer Roman. The true church is Palmarian, as you have preached yourself, assisted by the Holy Ghost. It is no longer possible to be Roman, as the Holy See has been moved by the order of Christ.

— Message of an alleged apparition of the Virgin Mary to Pope Gregory XVII, Chapel of Our Lady of the Miraculous Medal, Paris, 9 August 1979.

From 1978 until 1997, Palmarian Church leadership consisted of the following: Pope Gregory XVII at the very top, with the role of Secretary of State held by Cardinal Isidore (Corral) underneath and the number three position in the hierarchy was held by the Vice-Secretary of State, Cardinal Elias (Carmelo Pacheco Sánchez). All three were Spaniards, which led to some complaints from the membership, but they simply insisted that they were the most suitable men for the jobs as "three apocalyptic bulls who attack heretics with their mystical horns." The dynamic was that the Pope was the charismatic visionary and seer, while Corral, who he relied on to record everything, was the intellectual éminence grise. Some of the Palmarian bishops and laymen were unwilling to take the leap of accepting the claims of Domínguez to the Papacy and the Holy See moving to El Palmar de Troya, deciding to leave (some reconciled with Rome, others drifted away from religion). Some examples include Palmarian bishops, Maurice Revaz (who took the religious name Hermenegildo) and Alfred Seiwert-Fleige (who took the religious name Athanasius). Domínguez and twelve Cardinals in 1979 made an apostolic journey from El Palmar de Troya to the Holy Land, passing through places outside of Spain which had a significant number of Palmarian faithful such as Switzerland, Austria, Germany, Liechtenstein, France, Great Britain and Ireland.

Between 1978 and 1980, a total of forty-seven pontifical documents were published, before the opening of the First Palmarian Council. These covered the canonisation of over 1,000 new saints, the promulgation of various Mariological and Josephine dogmas, excommunications of "heretics", anathemas against freemasonry (especially), communism and capitalism, declarations of new Doctors of the Church, declaring as anathema anyone who "dare to condemn the marvelous work of the Holy Inquisition," calling on all nations to enact the death penalty for abortion (a "monstrous crime"), condemnations of the Vatican "Anti-Papacy", declaring the New Order of Mass anathema and stating that although the Holy Ghost convoked the Second Vatican Council, he was expelled from it by the majority of apostate bishops who were agents of freemasonry and even though some Catholic truths were present in the documents, due to Pope Paul VI being "drugged" and questions as to the authenticity of his signature on the documents, these aspects alone "invalidates the Council."

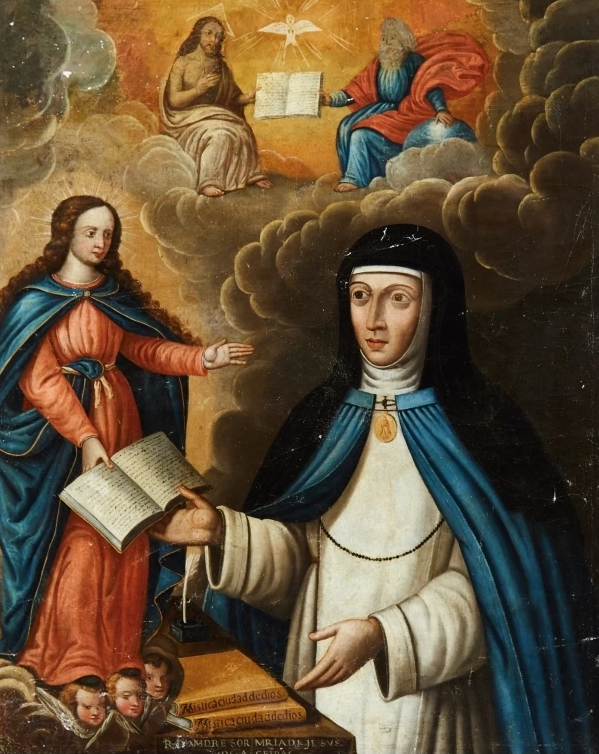
María de Jesús de Ágreda, author of the Mystical City of God. The writings of the Spanish mystic from the Conceptionists, influenced the doctrinal works of the First Palmarian Council.

Within the Palmarian Catholic Church, the First Palmarian Council (1980–1992) is recognised as the 21st ecumenical council of the Catholic Church, following on from the Council of Trent (1545–1563) and the Vatican Council (1869–1870), with the supposed "Second Vatican Council" having been declared as invalid. At the opening session on 30 March 1980, the Palmarian Credo was published, which lays out the basic teachings of the church. As part of the council, the Latin-Tridentine-Palmarian Rite of the Holy Mass was introduced on 9 October 1983. The final doctrinal work resulting from the twelve-year Council was the Treatise of the Mass (1992). This work takes the form of an allegorical interpretation of sacred scripture from the context of the Holy Sacrifice of the Mass, including the lives of Jesus Christ and the Virgin Mary, elaborated by the visions of Pope Gregory XVII, as well as integrating the works of Catholic mystics of a Marian apocalyptic bent, such as Maria de Jesús Ágreda (1602–1665) and Anna Katharina Emmerich (1774–1824).

A significant incident occurred on 19 May 1982, which furthered the conflict between Palmarians and the outside world. Pope Gregory XVII and a number of Palmarian bishops were visiting the Basilica of the Annunciation of Our Lady of Discalced Carmelites of Alba de Tormes, near Salamanca, which is the final resting place of St. Teresa of Ávila. Before the arrival of the Palmarians, there had been rumours spread that they intended to remove the relics of St. Teresa and take them back to El Palmar de Troya. While walking through the convent, the allegedly drunk Pope, along with his Palmarian bishops, shouted that John Paul II was an Antipope and told visiting women who were wearing trousers (considered immodest dress by the Palmarians) that they were whores. The Palmarian clerics were then set upon by a large number of local people, who attacked some of the bishops and tipped one of their vehicles into the River Tormes; they took refuge in the convent until the Guardia Civil could disperse the mob. As a direct response, between 30 and 31 July 1982, Pope Gregory XVII issued a number of decrees which stated that only Palmarians could receive grace and indulgencies from holy relics and images, but for members of "apostate, heretical and schismatic churches", such powers were now withdrawn, veiled to them and they could derive no supernatural value. They also declared that outside of the Palmarian Catholic Church, all powers of bishops, presbyters and deacons were now withdrawn by Pope Gregory XVII, meaning that outside of the Palmarian Church, no other alleged clergyman with holy orders could validly claim to exercise their power or have the right to legitimately perform any act of priestly ministry, including those pertaining to the holy sacraments of the church.

==== The Sacred History and the Great Expulsion ====
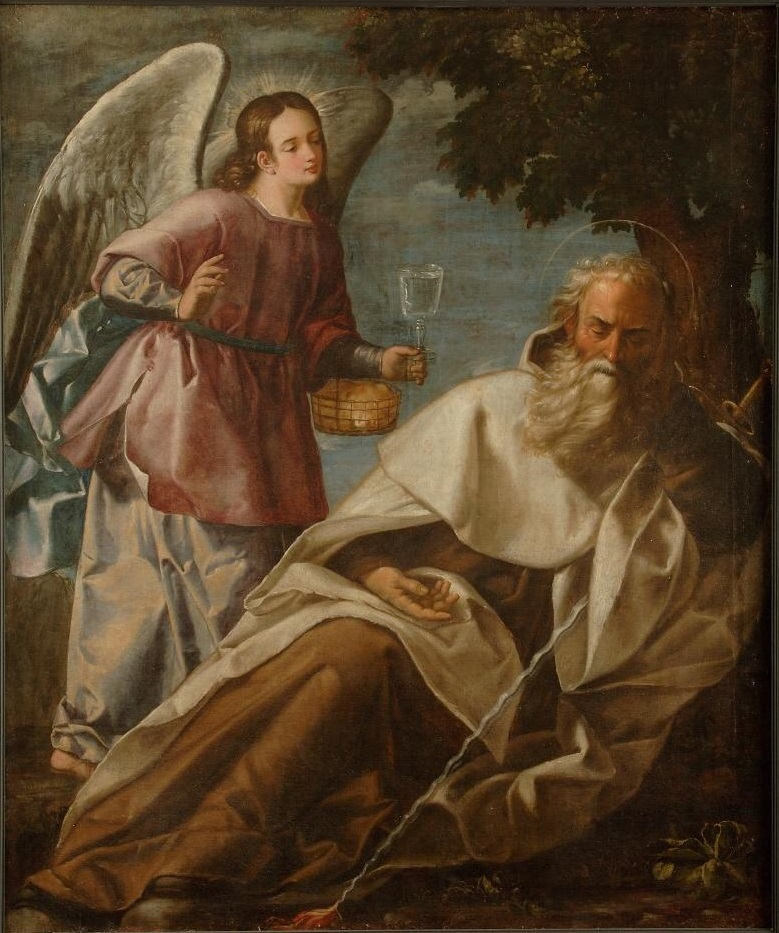
Pope Gregory XVII claimed in 1997 to have a vision of the Prophet Elias, who told him that errors had been introduced into the Bible over centuries and needed to be "purified."

The church leadership was shaken in 1997, as the number three and four in the Palmarian hierarchy: the Vice-Secretary, Fr. Elias María (Carmelo Pacheco Sánchez) and Fr. Leandro María (Camilo Estévez Puga) had died within two months of each other (Pacheco died in an automobile incident, hit by a truck). With this the Pope lost two of his stalwart supporters and most trusted advisors, which affected him deeply. Fr. Sergio María (Ginés Jesús Hernández), another Spaniard, who had been an electrician became the number three in the church. Pope Gregory XVII reported a vision in 1997 where the Prophet Elias allegedly appeared to him and said that the enemies of God (elsewhere described as "Jews and Masons") had at various historical junctures, distorted the pure word of God, which had originally been announced in the world by his Holy Prophets and that these groups had instead introduced adulterations, simulations and falsifications, which had distorted the original texts of sacred scripture (including in what would become the Latin Vulgate, traditionally favoured by the Catholic Church) and that its contents must thus be purified to "remove errors" and allow the doctrinally infallible, "purified Bible, full of light" to be accessible to mankind for the Last Times. The process in which this "purified" Bible, later to be called the Sacred History or Holy Palmarian Bible (2001), would be brought forward, was known as the Second Palmarian Council and it ran from between 1995 and 2002.

As part of this reviewing process, members of the Palmarian Church, including the clergy, were asked to hand in their old Catholic bibles based on the Vulgate or the Septuagint to be destroyed (which some opposed, saying that if they did so they could not even study Treatise of the Mass, which references it throughout). During this time, there had been a decline in numbers in the Palmarian Church and even among those who remained a significant number of believers, both religious (bishops and nuns) and sympathetic laymen, began to quietly doubt the Pope's mental health and conduct, questioning in particular the orthodoxy of the proposals of the Second Palmarian Council on the Bible (to be "purified" with "The Sacred History or Holy Palmarian Bible") and other aspects, considering them rash changes. This group also raised concerns about the more intense application of the Palmarian Moral Code (also known as "The Norms"), which they accused of moving the Palmarian Church away from the traditional moral and pastoral Catholic theology to a coercive rigorism, which induced extreme scrupulosity and forced family members to cut off all communications (i.e. - social shunning) with those who had been "legitimately excommunicated", rather than seeking their reconciliation through dialogue with those who had fallen away.

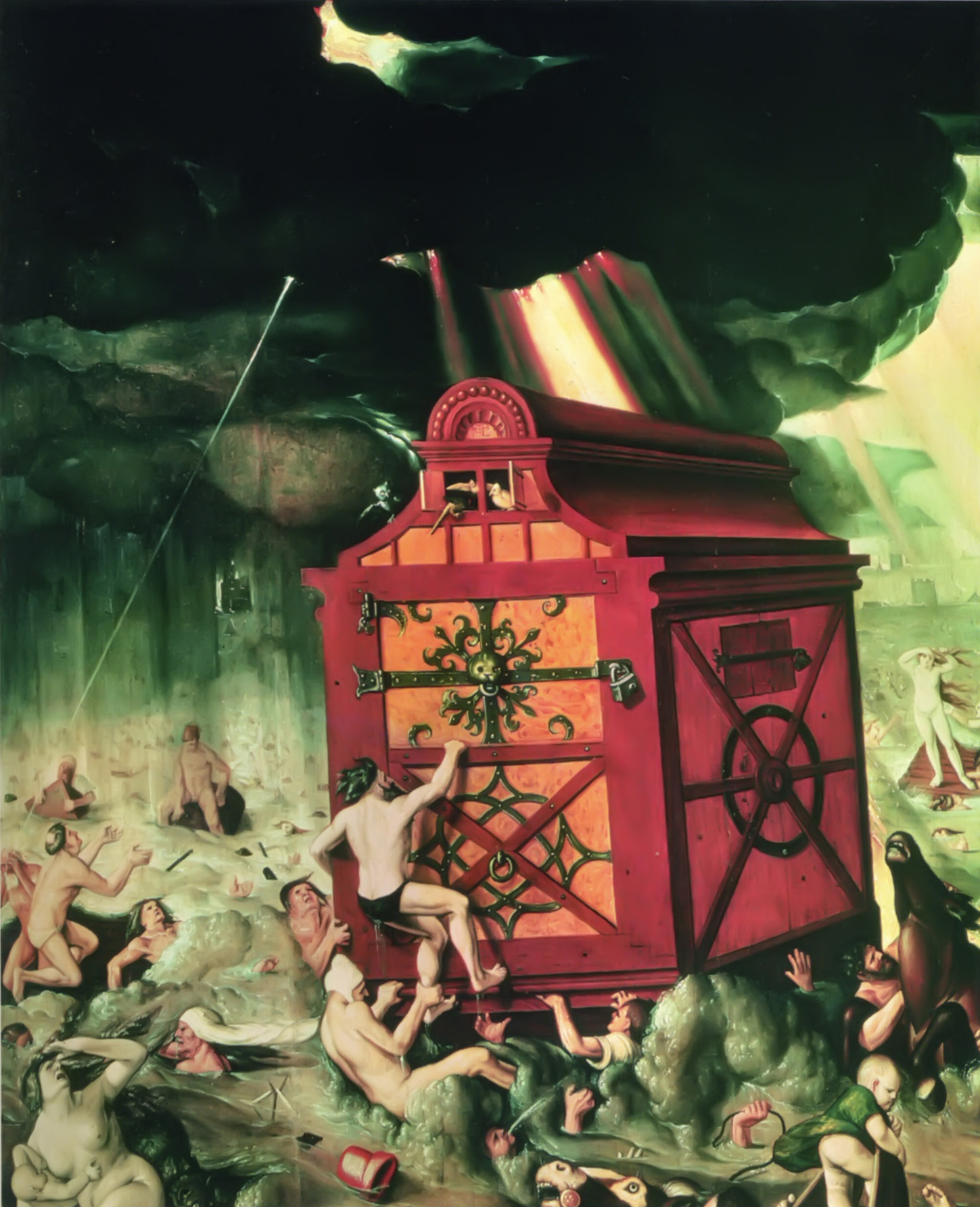
Pope Gregory XVII in his later reign called himself the "Apocalyptic Noah" and compared the numerically reduced, but defiant remnant, the Palmarian Church, to the Ark of Salvation.

As the Palmarian Catholic Church had moved toward the new millennium, the first signs of an internal issue had begun to emerge on 30 March 1995, as the Palmarian Cardinalate was suppressed, meaning there would not be a conclave after the Pope's death. As the decade wore on, the dissident Palmarians began to discuss their concerns secretly among themselves, with burner phones and the like to hide their communications, though control over members had increased by this time, with strict rules on personal conduct beginning to be brought in. Indiscreet communications led to the Palmarian leadership uncovering the dissident network. Fr. Sergio (Ginés Jesús Hernández) made his mark by playing a role in their "unmasking". A knife that was discovered in one of the rooms of the dissidents was presented to the Pope as part of a conspiracy to murder him. Fearful of a "coup", the Pope proclaimed on 24 October 2000, that Fr. Isidore (Corral) was to be his Papal successor.

Finally, on 5 November 2000, the matter of the dissidents came to a head: eighteen Palmarian bishops and seven Palmarian nuns were anathematised and excommunicated, expelled from the property and declared ex-Palmarian. Ex-Fr. Isaac María (José Antonio Perales Salvatella), the former confessor to the Pope was declared as the heresiarch in chief, a new Martin Luther, as a "founder of an anti-church or tenebrous sect", leader of a conspiracy to overthrow the Pope. Many members of this group moved to Archidona, near Málaga and continued to proclaim themselves as Palmarians, but now sedevacantist, claiming that the Pope had fallen into error and lost the Chair of St. Peter. Some even set up in Paraguay for a while. Others, such as, Ex-Fr. Guido María (Robert McCormack) and Ex-Fr. Dámaso María (Juan Marquez), moved away from Palmarianism completely, declaring it a fraud and accusing the church of perpetuating psychological abuse, with the dawning of the internet became vocal anti-Palmarian activists.

==== Palmarian Catholic Church in 21st century ====
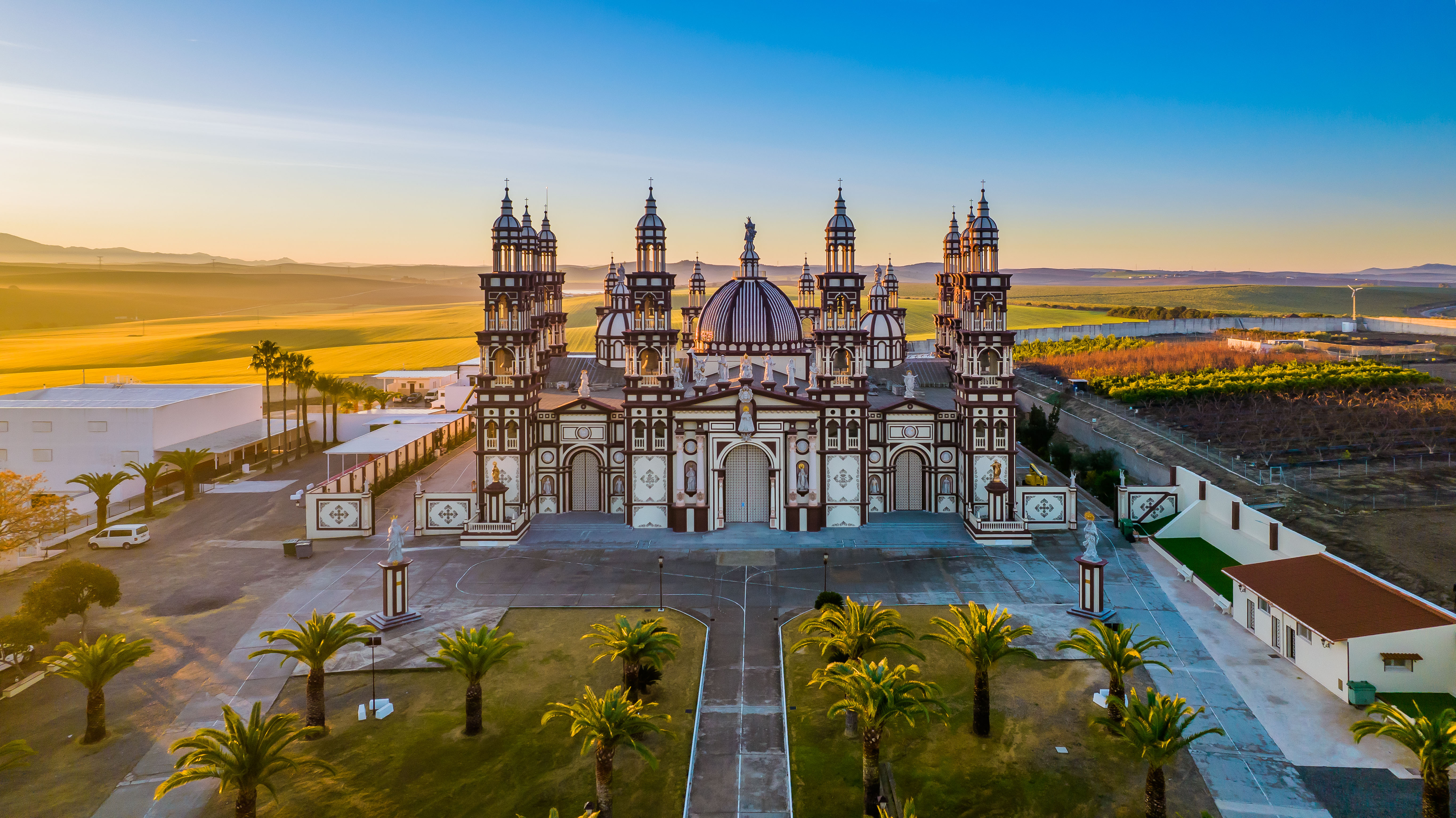
The Cathedral-Basilica of Our Crowned Mother of Palmar, the headquarters of the Palmarian Church, was completed in 2014.

Following the death of Pope Gregory XVII in 2005, as his Palmarian Secretary of State, Manuel Alonso Corral (Fr. Isidore María), automatically ascended to the Palmarian Papacy. He chose as his Papal name, Pope Peter II, which had so far been avoided by Catholic Popes since the time of Peter the Apostle. Having been the discreet intellectual power behind the throne of the previous Pontificate, not claiming any visions himself, Pope Peter II's Papacy was mostly defined around defending Palmarian Orthodoxy in Papal documents. Though he did in 2006 define as dogma the doctrine of the birth of the Antichrist into the world at the millennium and the circumstances of his birth to the “Anti-Mary.” The leitmotif of his Papacy was a deeper sense of Palmarian identity over national ones and a more rigorous focus on the need to uphold “The Norms”, with Palmarians increasing required to cut themselves off from the "moral depravity of the surrounding world", for the Palmarians, a “world totally dominated by Satan.” During this time, the Palmarian Church did not actively seek to grow its membership and avoided even having an internet presence, suffering from members leaving and also a shortage of religious vocations. Pope Peter II died on 15 July 2011, after a long illness.

Fr. Sergio María (born Ginés Jesús Hernández), as the previous Palmarian Secretary of State under Pope Peter II, ascended to the Palmarian Papacy next in 2011 as Pope Gregory XVIII. Lacking the charisma of Domínguez and the intellectual polish of Corral, Pope Gregory XVIII was instead characterised as a “managerial Pope”, an administrator, rather than a visionary or theologian and looked to uphold the basic teachings of traditional Palmarian Catholicism. His style was highly authoritarian and militaristic, characterised by some critics as “unpredictable” and “angry”. During the early years of his Pontificate, strengthening “The Norms” even further was of central focus and this became increasingly hardline and controversial, with a harder stance on shunning family members who became apostates (including splitting up families, as well as expelling teenagers from homes), regulating that Palmarian schoolchildren should not play or talk with non-Palmarian classmates and making it an excommunicable offense to leave property in a will to apostates or “public anti-Palmarians.”

In terms of religious developments in the reign of Pope Gregory XVIII, in 2012, the annual celebration of Palmarian Holy Week was moved to a permanently fixed date, with Holy Friday always falling on 25 March, inline with the teachings of The Sacred History or Holy Palmarian Bible. An extensive six-volume Palmarian Lives of the Saints was published and the Cathedral-Basilica of Our Crowned Mother of Palmar would be completed by 2014. In 2012, Pope Gregory XVIII had declared a Third Palmarian Council, which mostly focused on codifying issues relating to “The Norms”. Internet use was banned in 2012 and the Pope claimed that, “newspapers, radio, TV and the Internet", were controlled by "Freemasons and Zionists.” Between 2013 and 2016, publications were less frequent from the Palmarian Papacy, typically focusing on defending Palmarian claims and critiquing the statements of Francis in the Vatican, or "Antipope Pancho", in the words of Pope Gregory XVIII. Toward the end of his reign, in 2016, claiming to be following the Roman model of the Swiss Guard, Pope Gregory XVIII set up his own Palmarian Papal Guard, consisting mostly of German-speaking Palmarians, they dressed in red berets and khaki uniforms reminiscent of the Carlist requetés. In the last few months of his reign, Pope Gregory XVIII relaxed some of the harshest rules in a document entitled The Easing of Several Norms, citing "morbid scruples" some of the rules had driven the laity to and eschewing "extremism."

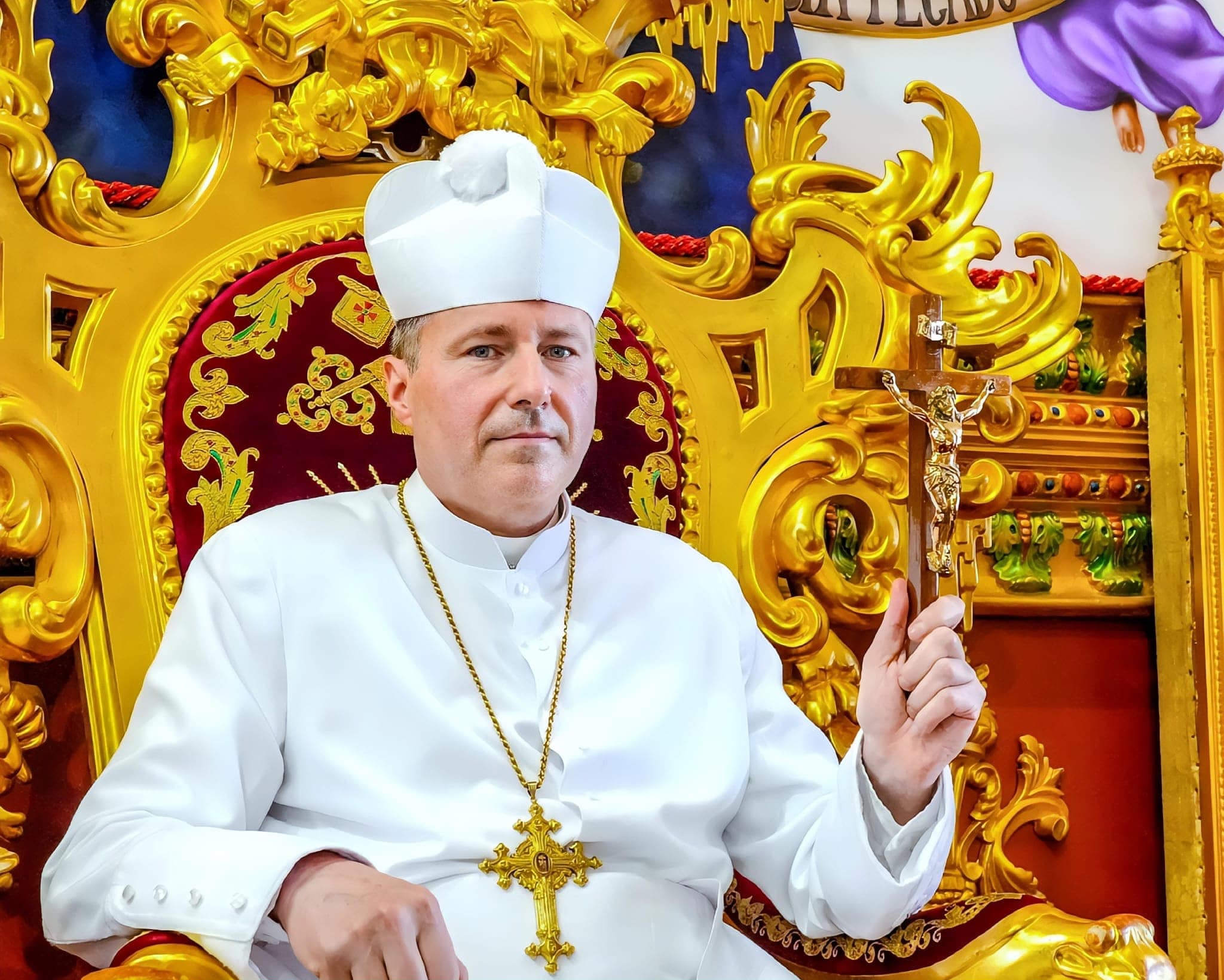
Pope Peter III, fourth pope and primate of the Palmarian Catholic Church

There was a major defection on 22 April 2016, as Pope Gregory XVIII announced that he was abdicating from the Palmarian Papacy due to losing the faith. The Papacy passed automatically to his Palmarian Secretary of State, Fr. Eliseo María (born Joseph Odermatt). A Swiss Palmarian and the first non-Spanish Palmarian Pope, he took Pope Peter III as his Papal name. It transpired that Ex-Pope Gregory XVIII had been involved in a relationship with an ex-Palmarian nun, Nieves Triviño and had absconded from El Palmar de Troya to marry her. Hernández was declared “Ex-Pope Gregory XVIII the Apostate” by the Palmarian Church, accusing him of stealing assets belonging to the church and being extremely vainglorious, stating he was corrupted by lust (comparing him to the decadent Borgia Pope Alexander VI), stating also that a Pope should be a father not a tyrant. Although acknowledging that no heresy was to be found in the Third Palmarian Council, Pope Peter III declared that it had now been erased, as it had instituted many more “unnecessary Norms”, that Hernández was motivated by pride. This essentially rolled back The Norms to where they were in 2011. Hernández spoke to the Spanish media, including El País, defending himself and downplaying his mistress, claiming that, through study he had concluded that the original apparitions of Our Lady of Palmar had been genuine, but that they had been hijacked by Clemente and Manolo for financial manipulation.

A serious incident occurred on 10 June 2018 at the Cathedral-Basilica of Our Crowned Mother of Palmar in El Palmar de Troya. While most religious were inside celebrating Holy Mass, two would-be thieves in balaclavas scaled the walls of the compound with a telescopic ladder, armed with a knife, two clown masks, cable ties, duct tape, two pairs of pliers and a crowbar. They were disturbed outside of the Cathedral-Basilica by a Palmarian bishop, Fr. Silvestre María, who was then attacked with a crowbar by the assailants, the noise from the struggle was overheard by another Palmarian bishop, Fr. Jesús María, who came to his assistance. It turned out that the two thieves were Ex-Pope Gregory XVIII the Apostate and his wife, Nieves Triviño. All four parties were injured, but Hernández received a knife wound to the chest with the very knife he had brought, requiring evacuation by helicopter to a hospital in Seville. The struggle had draw the attention of the other Palmarians from inside who called the Guardia Civil and the Servicios de Emergencias Médicas. After his condition was stabilised, Hernández underwent an extensive legal prosecution, eventually being convicted and sentenced to six years for “armed robbery, grave assault and assault” and Triviño for five. Ultimately, the duo were required to pay a large fine to the Palmarian bishops and their sentences were suspended.

Under Pope Peter III, initially, the new Palmarian Secretary of State was Fr. Benjamin María (Manuel Ambrosio Sánchez) and the Vice-Secretary of State was Fr. Abraham María (Paul Fox), a veteran Irish Palmarian who had been a Palmarian from the earliest days. Despite the chaotic circumstances of his ascent to the Papacy, the less erratic style of the Swiss Pontiff has seen an expanding public profile for the Palmarian Catholic Church. Part of the reason for the renewed global interest was a result of the novelist Dan Brown publishing the fictional book Origin in 2017, where the Palmarian Church plays a key role in the book's plot. The Palmarian Church also established an online presence as part of its evangelisation projects, with a website in numerous different languages and opened accounts from 2019 onward on social media platforms such as Facebook, Instagram, Twitter, Pinterest, YouTube and TikTok, allowing the general public to view its religious beliefs, modes of worship and public works. During the COVID-19 pandemic in Spain, there were a number of positives cases in the compound, including 4 deaths due to the virus, which drew media attention. Fr. Benjamin María was demoted as a consequence on 13 February 2021, with Fr. Abraham María raised to Palmarian Secretary of State and Fr. Jesús María (Alfredo Leonardo Villalba), an Argentine former military policeman raised to Palmarian Vice-Secretary of State.

== Doctrine ==
=== The Triune God ===
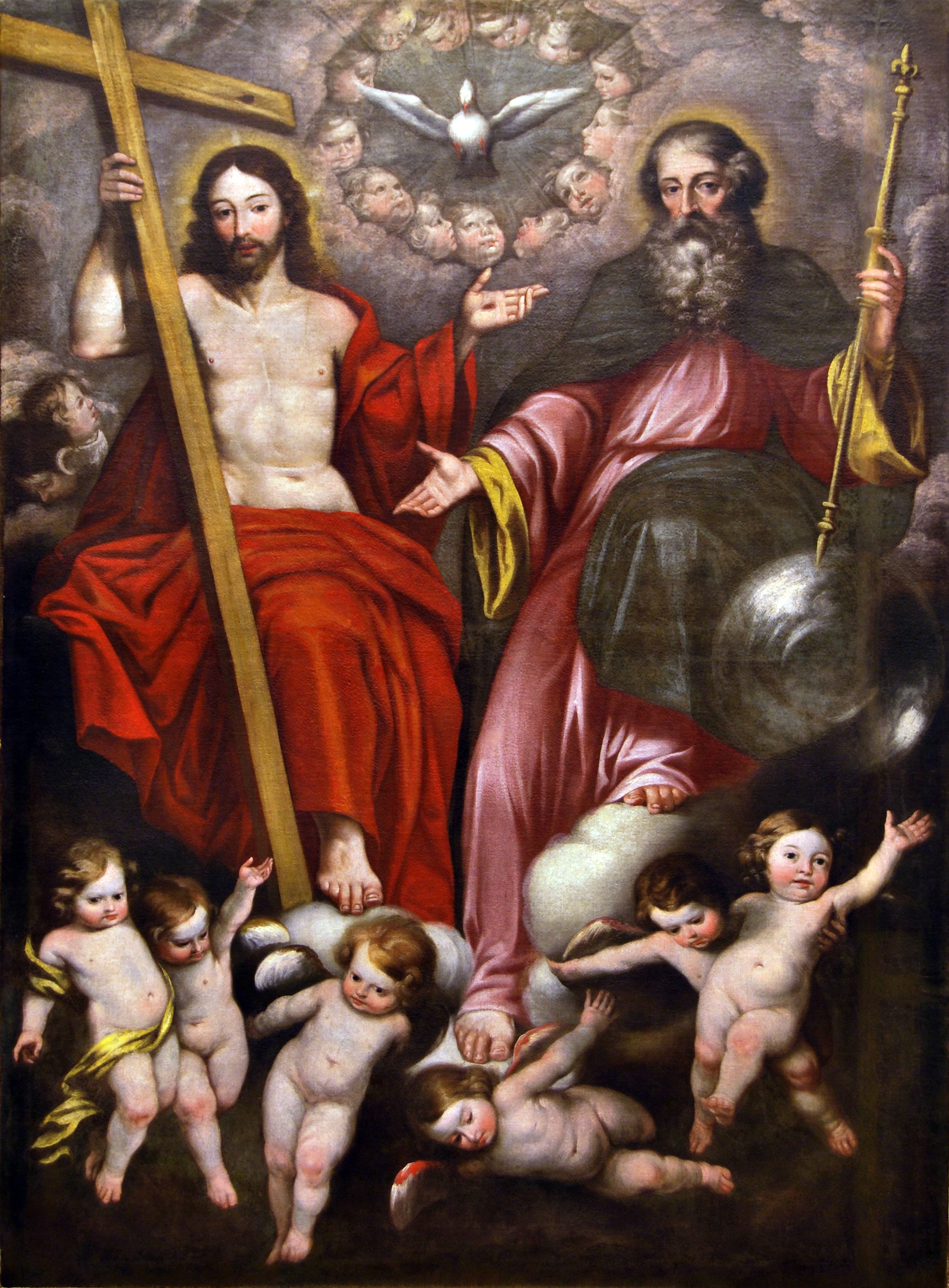
Santísima Trinidad by Antonio García Reinoso. The Palmarian Church teaches that the Triune God is the supreme truth of universal history.

According to Magnus Lundberg, the Palmarian Church "on a basic level, follows the Trinitarian teachings in the Nicene-Constantinopolitan Creed (325/381), and the further Christological definitions at the Councils of Ephesus (431) and Chalcedon (451)." The Palmarian Catholic Church professes Trinitarian Christianity, with the Palmarian Credo laying out their belief in the one God, the Triune God, one in essence, with three persons; the Eternal Father, the Son (or the Divine Word) and the Holy Ghost. As a result of the Second Palmarian Council, held between 1995 and 2002, in which the Vulgate was "purified" as The Sacred History or Holy Palmarian Bible, the primary religious text of the church, the Palmarians explicitly centre in this Bible, the Triune God as the supreme overarching truth of universal history and by name mention the Triune God and its three persons in the "purified" Book of Genesis onward (in the "Old Version" of the Old Testament, used before the Second Palmarian Council, this was far more ambiguous). One of the central devotions practiced by the faithful in the Palmarian Catholic Church is the Holy Trisagion to the Most Holy Trinity.

In its Christology, the Palmarian Church teaches that the human soul of Jesus Christ was created by God before anything in the material universe and that this was followed immediately by the creation of the soul of the Holy Virgin Mary. In this, the Palmarians in a limited sense borrow from and somewhat rehabilitate Origen of Alexandria, who taught that the souls of all intelligent beings were created before the universe. This concept is an essential element of one of the central Palmarian doctrines; the Mystical Espousal of Christ and Mary. The Palmarian Church and its Bible teaches that their souls were spiritually espoused from the very beginning and state that there were other theophanies in history; they claim that the soul of Jesus Christ assumed the body of Melquisedec, Priest and King of Salem (Jerusalem) and that the Holy Virgin Mary's soul assumed the body of his chaste wife, Essenia, Queen of Salem (the Essenes play an important role in Palmarian historiography and are seen as synonymous with the Carmelites). Aspects of the teaching, symbolised by the union of the Sacred Heart of Jesus and the Immaculate Heart of Mary, are to be found in the writings of St. Jean Eudes, St. Marguerite-Marie Alacoque and 20th century French visionary Jeanne-Louise Ramonet.

=== Most Holy Virgin Mary ===
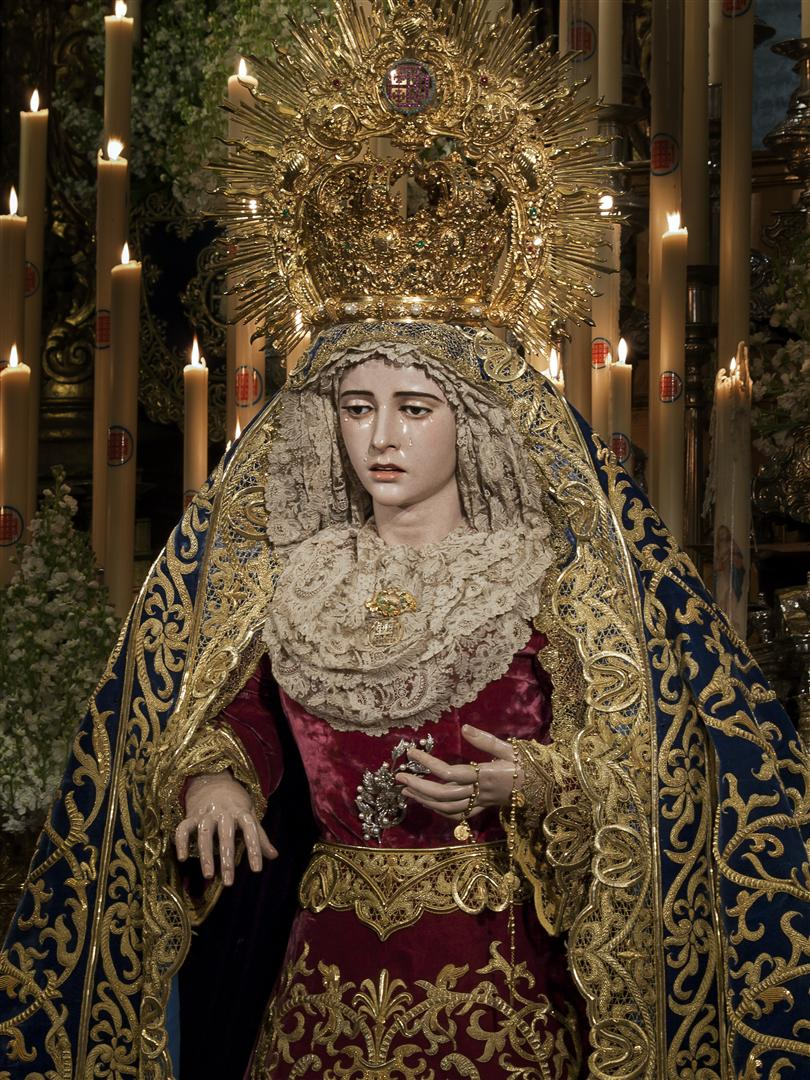
An Immaculate Conception statue of the Blessed Virgin Mary from Andalusia. ¡Ave María Purísima! is the greeting used between Palmarians.

In its doctrine and devotional practices, the Palmarian Church places a strong emphasis on the Blessed Virgin Mary. They state "It is common among Palmarians to love the Most Holy Virgin Mary intensely. This is a point where no discussion is allowed." The established greeting when two Palmarian faithful meet each other is, ¡Ave María Purísima! (Hail Mary Most Pure) and the response, sin pecado concebida (conceived without sin). Just as the Catholic Church historically proclaimed as infallible doctrine, certain teachings about the Blessed Virgin Mary, such as the Immaculate Conception (1854) under Pope Pius IX and the Assumption of Mary (1950) under Pope Pius XII, the Palmarian Pontiffs have declared as infallible other Marian maximalist teachings. On 12 August 1978, Pope Gregory XVII in his Second Document proclaimed as further infallible doctrines, binding on all the faithful, four major Marian teachings; Mary, Mediatrix of All Graces, Co-Redemptrix, Queen of Heaven and Earth and Mother of the Church.

The Palmarian Church teaches that the Eternal Father formed the soul of the Blessed Virgin Mary before the creation of Heaven and Earth. One of the proclaimed infallible doctrines, with great significance for Palmarian soteriology, elaborated by the church is the Mystical Espousal of Christ and Mary: as part of this doctrine it is taught that a particle of Christ's Sacred Heart and a drop of his Most Precious Blood was "enthroned" within her and likewise, a particle of Mary's Immaculate Heart and a drop of her blood was "enthroned" within him. This has implications for sacramental theology. Linking in with this, the Palmarians teach that through baptism, the baptised receives a drop of Mary's blood, washing away original sin, which is strengthened by confirmation. Committing a mortal sin causes the blood drop to disappear, requiring confession to a priest to re-enter a state of grace. In 1982, Pope Gregory XVII proclaimed as infallible doctrine the real presence of both Jesus Christ and Blessed Virgin Mary in the Blessed Sacrament of the Eucharist. This doctrine is not completely novel, having precedents in the Catholic theological writings of some 17th century Franciscan and Jesuit authors, such as Cristóbal de Vega (1595–1672) in his Theologia Mariana.

=== Holy Saint Joseph ===
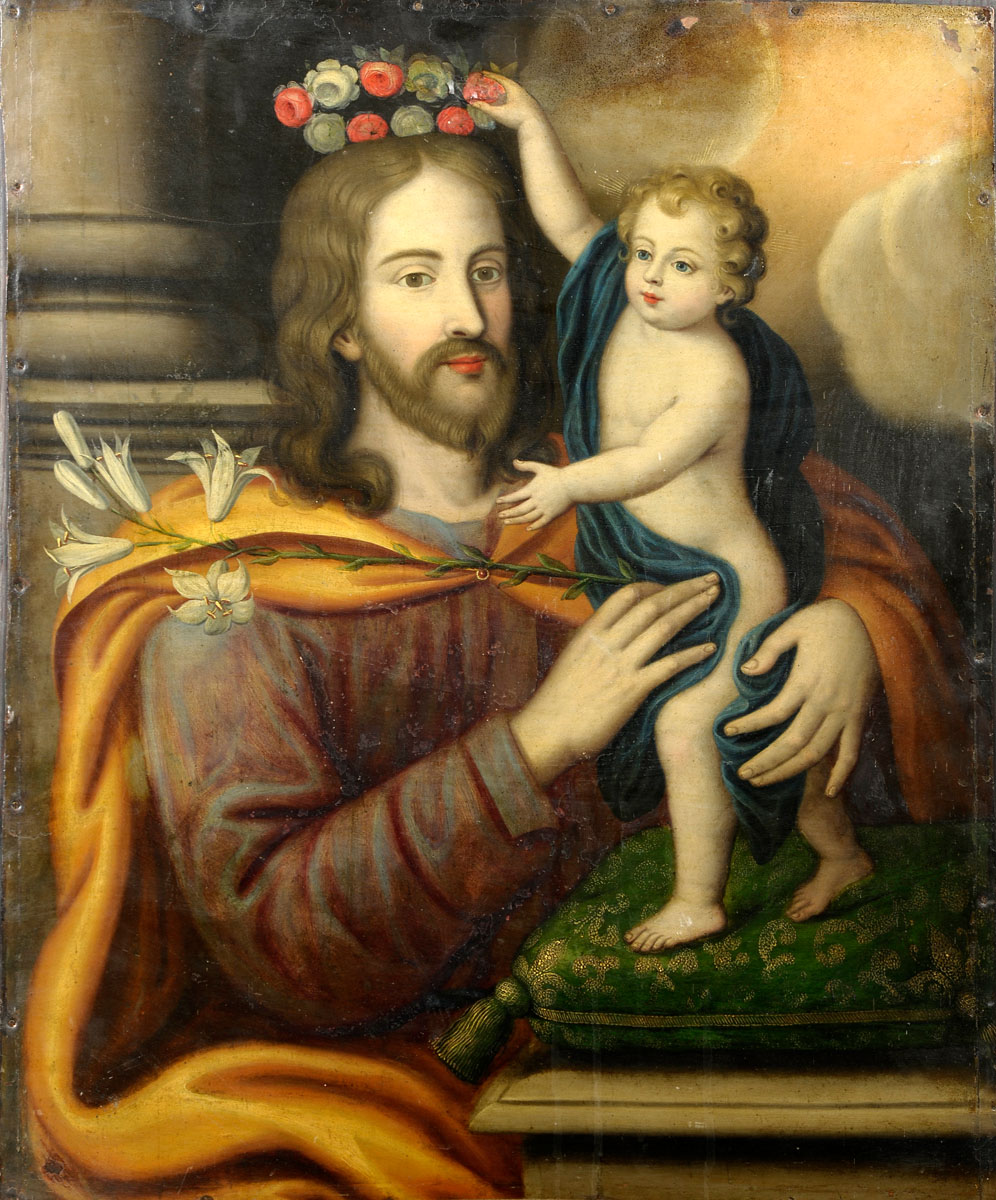
Saint Joseph crowned by the Infant Jesus, an 18th-century Portuguese painting. Palmarians have defined doctrines on Saint Joseph.

As with more in-depth doctrinal teachings on the Blessed Virgin Mary, the Palmarian Church has lauded the greater emphasis on Saint Joseph and his nature as a member of the Holy Family in more recent times, which began in 1870 with Pope Pius IX proclaiming Saint Joseph Patron of the Universal Church and Pope Leo XIII issuing the encyclical Quamquam pluries in 1889. In addition to this, Pope John XXIII added the name of Saint Joseph to the Roman Canon in 1962 and according to the Palmarians, he "professed great love for Most Glorious Saint Joseph." All three of these Roman Pontiffs have been canonised as saints by the Palmarian Catholic Church. During the reign of Pope Gregory XVII, in his Third Document issued on 13 August 1978, the Palmarian Pontiff proclaimed infallible doctrines on the nature of Saint Joseph; the Presanctification of Joseph, the Assumption of Joseph and Father and Doctor of the Church.

The Palmarian teachings on Saint Joseph are included in the Credo and thus must be publicly professed by all believers. The teachings on the nature of Saint Joseph are inherently tied to his relationship to the Blessed Virgin Mary and thus Jesus Christ. The Palmarian Church proclaimed as doctrine in 1978, that Saint Joseph was pre-sanctified in the womb of his mother in the third month after his conception. The significance of this pre-sanctification is that from this point on he was freed from the stain of original sin. Thus, unlike the Blessed Virgin Mary's Immaculate Conception, his existence was not immaculate from the point of conception, but by the time he was born into the world he was born without the ability to commit any sin during his existence, as a worthy spouse of the Blessed Virgin Mary (the "Second Eve"). The Palmarians teach that Saint Joseph remained a virgin throughout his life and never questioned the perpetual virginity of the Blessed Virgin Mary. The Palmarian Church also declared as doctrine that the year after the resurrection of Christ, Saint Joseph was resurrected and assumed into heaven, in body and soul.

=== Eschatology ===
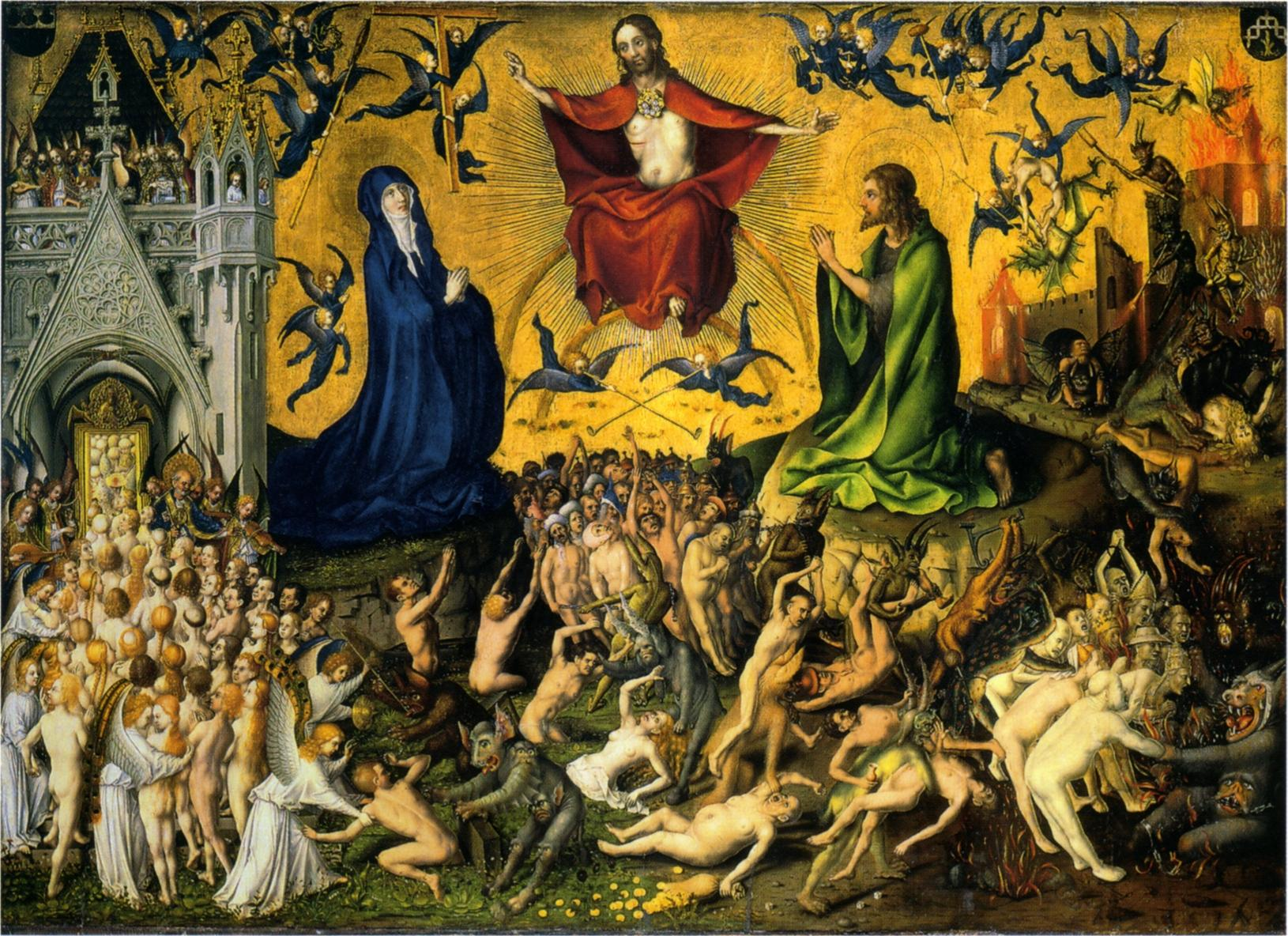
Last Judgement by Stefan Lochner. The Palmarians believe that Jesus Christ will return in the Second Coming for the Last Judgement, where all mankind will be judged and their final, eternal destination (heaven or hell) decided.

As with the Roman Catholic Church historically, the Palmarian Church teaches that immediately after death, the soul of each human being is brought before Jesus Christ and receives a particular judgement, where they are judged by God based on their lives, they are accused with the sins that they committed (and whether or not they died in a state of sanctifying grace), their devotion and loyalty to God and membership of his One, Holy, Catholic and Apostolic Church. The Palmarians teach that those who die in a state of sanctifying grace are sent to the Planet of Mary, where sin is absent and the Church Triumphant waits here for the final battle against Antichrist. Likewise, the godless are sent to the Planet of Lucifer, where they are under the leadership of Satan, awaiting the final battle. In the afterlife, following death, heaven, hell, purgatory and limbo are understood as different states, rather than physical locations.

Supposedly, before the Second Coming of Jesus Christ, comes the Antichrist. An in-depth and specific account of the Antichrist is given in the Palmarian Catechism. The Palmarian Church teaches that a Beast of a woman, consecrated to Satan is brought up, as an Anti-Mary (the antithesis of the Blessed Virgin Mary), a false virgin from a Jewish background. Both Satan and the Virgin Mary appear before her, as she is given the choice over becoming Satan's mother, with the former arguing for and the latter against, using her free will, the Anti-Mary chooses in the affirmative. She joins a "Jewish religious group involved in Satan worship" and eventually becomes their leader. In a great Masonic Lodge, elaborately decorated with an inverted crucifix, she copulates on the altar with an apostate ex-Palmarian Bishop, dressed in his clerical attire. Described as "extraordinarily beautiful and seductive", upon the completion of the act of fornication, the Anti-Mary immediately strangles the ex-Bishop and kills him (whereby he goes straight to hell). The Antichrist; Satan; is immediately conceived in the flesh and all of hell rejoices. The entire ceremony is witnessed by a group of leading 33rd degree Freemasons.

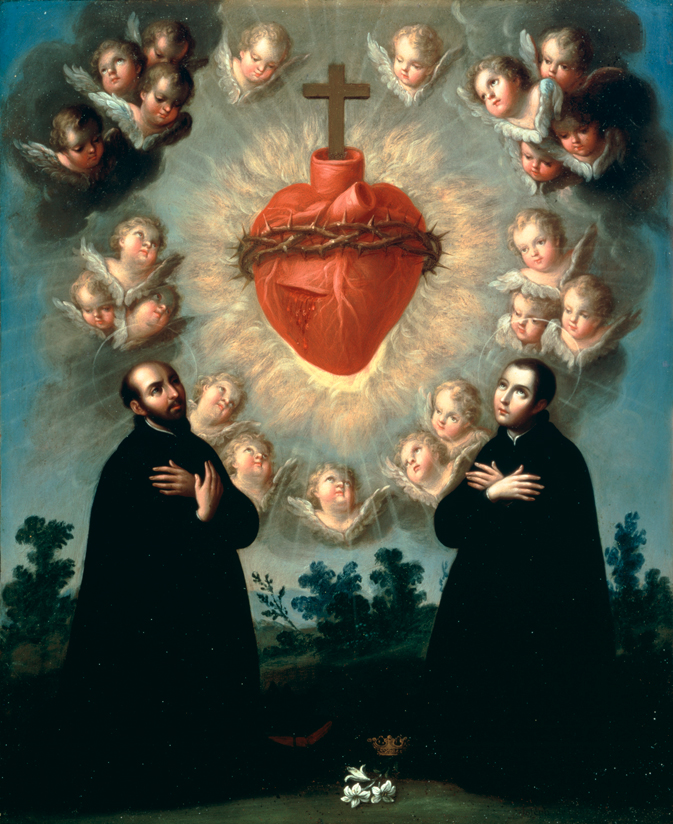
Sacred Heart by José de Páez. According to the Palmarian Church, upon the final judgement, the elect are directly enthroned into the Sacred Heart of Jesus Christ.

The church teaches a chronology of the apocalypse, based on the Book of Revelation and supplemented by visions received by Pope Gregory XVII the Very Great, as presented in the Sacred History and the Palmarian Catechism. Palmarians believe the world is now in the end times, signified by the supposed Great Apostasy of Rome from the Catholic faith, through compromises with Protestantism and Freemasonry, with the Vatican-based Church becoming the Great Whore (as informed by Marian prophecies from Our Lady of La Salette onward). Thus, according to the Palmarian Church, the Antichrist was born in Jerusalem in the year 2000 and made a brief entry in the world in 2012. Physically, the False Messiah appears to be a man, but is literally Satan in the flesh and will persecute the true believers (the Palmarians). An epic final battle, the Armageddon, between Good and Evil will take place on Earth, whereby the inhabitants of the Planet of Mary and Planet of Lucifer return to fight for their respective sides. The wicked lose the contest and are cast into hell.

The Palmarian Church teaches that, not long after this conflict, the bodies of the dead are raised and Jesus Christ returns to Earth in the Second Coming, where the final judgement of each individual human being takes place. He returns at Jerusalem, but is visible from all over the world. At the conclusion of the final judgement, there will be only two destinations; the just, the elect who are saved, will be directly enthroned into the Sacred Heart of Christ, beholding the beatific vision and will live in glory in a blissful and heavenly state forever. Meanwhile, the wicked and the damned are enthroned into the dark heart of Satan, where they are to burn in hell, body and soul, tormented by demons for all eternity.

== Traditions ==
=== Documents and texts ===
Within the Palmarian Church, building on from the pre-1978 Magisterium of the Catholic Church, there is a heavy emphasis on documents which lay out the Palmarian Catholic teachings since then, which it considers the authentic continuation of the Catholic Magisterium. The Palmarian Church does not allow its religious works to be publicly sold for profit, but instead distributes them among its members free of charge, however, in the information age, many of these documents are now freely available on the internet for anybody to access. The core texts of the church, following the move of the Holy See from Rome in 1978, are the Papal documents of Pope Gregory XVII, released between 1978 and 1980 (every Pope since has released documents, but these in particular are considered pivotal), the Palmarian Creed (1980), the Treatise of the Mass (1992) which was the end product of the First Palmarian Council and the Sacred History or Holy Palmarian Bible (2000–2001), the end product of the Second Palmarian Council, a reworking of the Catholic Bible. In addition to this, there is a Palmarian Catechism, which lays out the teachings for the faithful and a Palmarian Devotionary, which lays out the central pious practices and modes of worship.

As explained by professor Magnus Lundberg (Uppsala University), in 1997 Clemente Domínguez claimed that Elijah had appeared to him, claiming that the current Bible is "filled with errors that had been introduced by Judeo-Masonic groups through the centuries" and that it was his mission to revise it. Therefore, after 4 years of work, the Holy Palmarian Bible was published in five volumes in 2001, followed by a smaller two-volumes versions and an illustrated version for children. According to Lundberg, the changes were "dramatic": entire parts of the biblical books were omitted and numerous parts are "almost unrecognizable due to the allegorical and apocalyptical interpretations, which Gregory [i.e. Clemente Domínguez] claimed reflected the original intentions of the divine author. All of this makes the work very different from the traditional Bibles, both in structure and content" states Lundberg. The Bible used by the Palmarian Christian Church is not available in public libraries. In 2018 Lundberg scanned one of the English versions and later published it on his blog.

=== Holy Sacrifice of the Mass ===
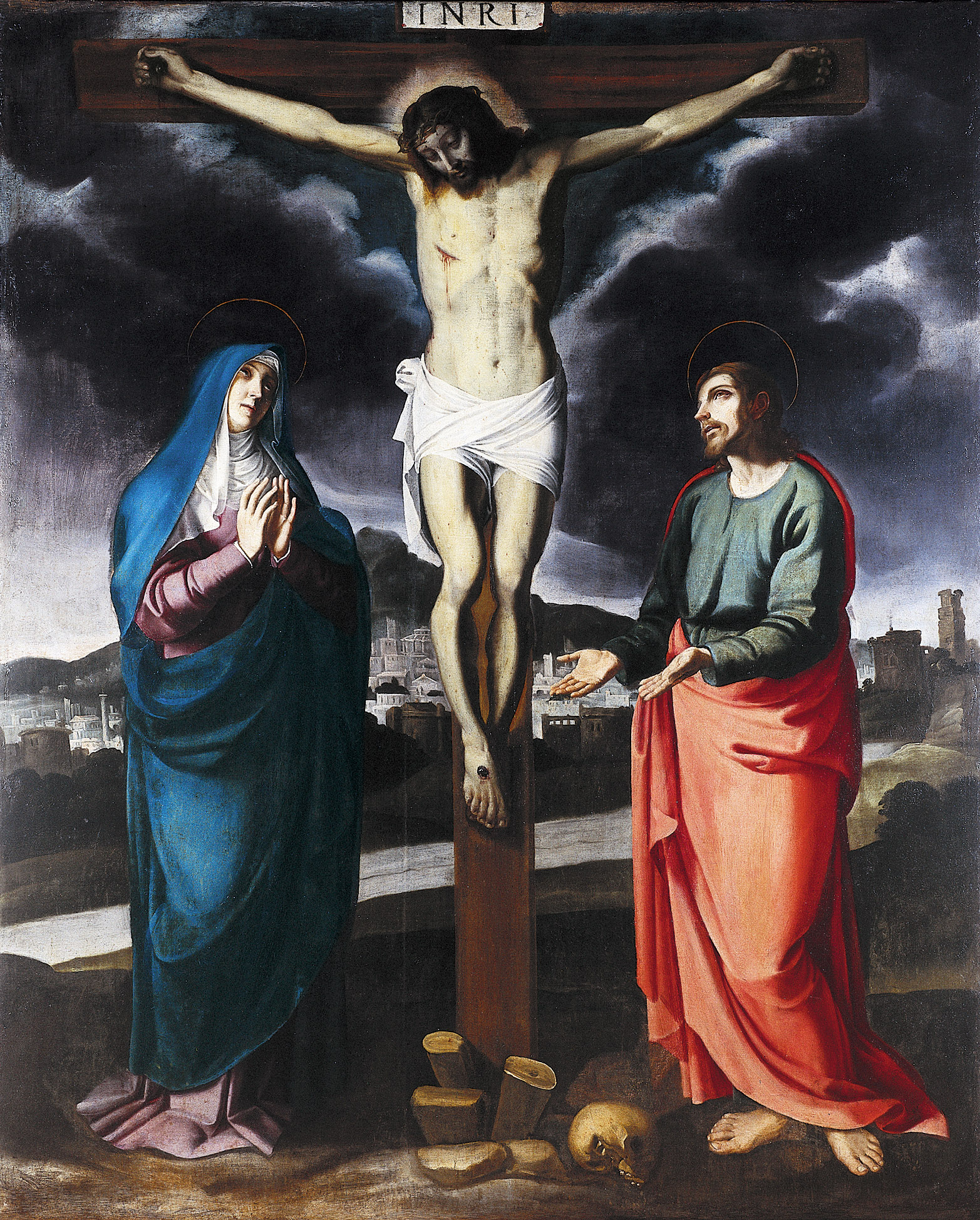
Calvário by André Reinoso. For Palmarians, the Holy Mass is a propitiatory sacrifice, the sacrifice of Jesus Christ at Calvary, with the Virgin Mary suffering at the foot of the Cross, not a commemorative supper.

The very first proclamation of the Pontificate of Pope Gregory XVII, on 8 August 1978, reestablished the "Holy Latin Tridentine Mass of St. Pius V" as the obligatory liturgical form and anathematised the New Order of Mass introduced c. 1970 as "confused, ambiguous, equivocal and heretical", forbidding the Palmarian Catholic faithful from serving at it, as well as forbidding the faithful from receiving the Holy Eucharist in the hand or standing. The reason given for this was to emphasise the Holy Sacrifice of the Mass as a propitiatory sacrifice, the sacrifice of Calvary, something which it claimed the New Order lacked (as well as being "elaborated and confected by heretics"). Palmarian Papal documents pillory the New Order as a "Lutheran supper", suggesting the Vatican is now compromised by Protestant theological precepts.

On 22 July 1980, Pope Gregory XVII reported a vision in which Pope Pius V appeared and advised him to make some alterations to the Tridentine Mass that he had originally promulgated in his papal bull Quo primum. From this year onward, their Mass began to be called the "Latin-Tridentine-Palmarian Rite". Finally, on 9 October 1983, the Apostolic Constitution and Dogmatic Definitions promulgated the Holy Palmarian Mass of His Holiness Pope Gregory XVII. This briefer Mass, based on the Tridentine, is concentrated to three "essential" parts; the offertory, consecration and sacrificial communion, making it around five minutes long. Therefore, Palmarian Catholic clergy do not celebrate an individual Mass, but numerous turns of Masses. The underlying reason for this revision, was that with so few Catholic priests in the world celebrating valid Masses, because of the introduction of the "illegitimate" (in Palmarian eyes) Novus Ordo and with so much atonement to God to be made for the sins of corrupted humanity, reducing the Holy Sacrifice of the Mass to its bare essentials would enable the sacrificing priesthood to be able to say many Masses consecutively. This was in light of the First Palmarian Council and the Treatise on the Mass.

According to Palmarian doctrine, the body, soul and blood of Christ is present in the consecrated bread and wine. In addition to this, the Virgin Mary is spiritually and really present in the Holy Eucharist, as her suffering at the foot of the cross is seen as an essential component of the sacrifice of Calvary, which the Mass is as a propitiatory sacrifice. To communicate a person must be in a state of grace; otherwise, it constitutes a sacrilege. Communion should only be taken on the tongue and the recipient must be kneeling when receiving the sacrament. The communion of the faithful is only received in one species; they only receive the Eucharistic bread. If due to long distances to the nearest Palmarian priest, it is not possible to attend Mass, the faithful should pray a penitential rosary instead. According to the precepts of the church, Palmarians should take communion at least every third month, but almost all Masses in the Basilica in El Palmar de Troya are celebrated without lay people taking communion. Still, if in a state of grace, a layperson is allowed to communicate several times per day.

== Organisation and members ==
=== The Palmarian Popes as Vicars of Christ ===
The symbol of the Holy See, featuring the Papal tiara and keys of St. Peter, features on all official Palmarian Papal documents.

The Palmarian Church considers the Patriarchate of El Palmar de Troya to be the current Holy See of the Catholic Church and as part of this considers the legitimate apostolic predecessors of the Palmarian Pope to be all of the Roman Pontiffs from Peter to Pope Paul VI whose legitimacy is confirmed by Gregory XVII's visions, and some who are unknown to history except from that source.

After Paul VI's death, it considers Rome to have fallen into apostasy and all reigning pontiffs in the Vatican City from Pope John Paul I onwards to be non-Catholic Antipopes and "precursors to Antichrist". The Palmarian Church claims that, following the death of Pope Paul VI in 1978, Jesus Christ mystically elevated Clemente Domínguez to the papacy as Pope Gregory XVII and from this point on the Holy See has been located in El Palmar de Troya. The full title used by the Palmarian Pope is "Sovereign Pontiff, Vicar of Christ, Successor of Saint Peter, Servant of the servants of God, Patriarch of El Palmar de Troya, Herald of the Lord God of Hosts, Aflame with the Zeal of Elias." Other titles used by the Palmarian Pontiff include "King of the Universe", "Caudillo" and the "Great Tagus."

==== Succession ====
To date, there have been four Popes in El Palmar de Troya and the current incumbent is Pope Peter III, since 2016. The Palmarian Church had a College of Cardinals between 1978 and 1995, but it never had the opportunity to select a Pope in a conclave. So far in the history of the Palmarian Church, each Pope has chosen his successor by decree, and has chosen his Secretary of State.

There is some precedent for this from before 1059 in the Catholic Church, when at times a pope would often nominate his preferred successor. On the question of whether the pope can appoint his successor, Catholic theologians and canonists have historically been divided. Some assert absolutely that he can; others, such as Cajetan, Torquemada, and Paludanus, say that he is forbidden to appoint his own successor by divine and natural law, so that if he attempted it, the appointment would be void; others, such as Suárez, take a middle position that the pope can choose his successor in rare cases when urgent necessity of the church requires it, but cannot prescribe this as the ordinary mode of succession, and if he were to do so it should not be observed, because the regular institution of a practice so inclined to lead to nepotism would be an unjust law. Anton Straub argues that there is no reason the pope's supreme power should not extend to the appointment of his successor, and that while a number of historical popes expressed their belief that they are incapable of this, they did not define that.

In the 6th century, Felix IV appointed Boniface II as his successor, and though his wishes were initially disregarded, Boniface was accepted as such after the death of Antipope Dioscorus; yet when Boniface attempted in like manner to appoint Vigilius as his successor, he was compelled by the clergy to retract this decree as contrary to divine law.

==== Divergences from the conventional list of popes ====
Although Vigilius is traditionally considered to have later become pope from 537 to 555, the Palmarian History of the Popes calls him an antipope and says that one "Saint Virgil the Great" was pope during this time, presided over a Second Council of Constantinople which took place at the same time as the Second Council of Constantinople under Vigilius, and was murdered and erased from history by Vigilius. A "Donus II" is said to have reigned in place of Pope Conon. Sergius III is judged an antipope, and Christopher the true pope during his time; a different man named Sergius III is then posited as true pope in the time of Pope Lando.

Pope John XII is called an antipope who opposed a pope named Saint Leo VIII; the historical Pope Leo VIII may be identical either with St Leo VIII or with an Antipope Leo VIII said to have opposed Pope Benedict V. Antipope Boniface VII is said to have been an antipope for eleven years, then the true pope for three. Antipope John XVI is said to have opposed a true pope also named John XVI. The last two years of John XIX's reign are assigned to a "John XX."

Benedict IX and Sylvester III are said to have been antipopes who opposed a non-historical Benedict IX and Benedict X. Martin IV and Honorius IV are said to have been antipopes opposed to another man named Martin IV and one Alexander V. The authority of the Council of Vienne is rejected. At the time of the Western Schism, where some Catholic authorities differ on which line of popes was the true one, the Palmarian History of the Popes acknowledges Urban VI and his successors as the true popes, and rejects the claimants elected by the authority of the Council of Pisa.

Because the historical Benedict IX became pope on three separate occasions, and is therefore conventionally counted as the 145th, 147th, and 150th pope, his replacement with the Palmarian Benedict IX, said to have had one continuous pontificate, causes a difference in the numbering of subsequent popes, balanced by the addition of Boniface VII, the Palmarian John XVI, and John XX. Pope Paul VI is therefore counted by the Palmarian Catholic Church as the 263rd pope, whereas he is usually called the 262nd.

No.	Portrait	Papal name	Personal name (Birth–Death)	Epithet	Pontificate
264 (Catholic); 1 (Palmarian)		Gregory XVII	Clemente Domínguez y Gómez (1946–2005)	de Glória Olívæ (Glory of the Olive)	6 August 1978 – 21 March 2005 (27 years)
265 (Catholic); 2 (Palmarian)		Peter II	Manuel Alonso Corral (1934–2011)	de Cruce Apocalýptica (Of the Apocalyptic Cross)	21 March 2005 – 15 July 2011 (6 years)
266 (Catholic); 3 (Palmarian)		Gregory XVIII	Ginés Jesús Hernández y Martinez (1959–)	Recéptor Christi (Receiver of Christ)	15 July 2011 – 22 April 2016 (5 years)
267 (Catholic); 4 (Palmarian)		Peter III	Markus Josef Odermatt (1966–)	de Glória Ecclésiæ (Glory of the Church)	22 April 2016 – present (10 years)

=== Church Militant: friars, nuns and seculars ===
Living, active members of the Palmarian Church; whether religious or laymen; must be formally enrolled into the religious order of the Palmarian Church known as the Order of the Carmelites of the Holy Face in Company of Jesus and Mary (Spanish: Orden Religiosa de los Carmelitas de la Santa Faz en Compañía de Jesús y María). This, as with many historical Catholic religious orders, is organised into three distinct aspects: the friars, the nuns and the seculars (members of the Palmarian laity who belong to the third order). Thus, in the Palmarian Catholic Church, actively engaging with the spirit of the Order is essential, regardless of vocation and laxity not a possibility. Exact up to date numbers for those currently belonging to one of the three bodies of the Carmelites of the Holy Face (and thus Palmarian Catholic Church) are hard to come by, however, in a sermon delivered in August 2011, the then reigning Pope Gregory XVIII claimed that there were between 1,000 and 1,500 members. Between 1976 and 2005, there were 192 men consecrated to the priesthood and ordained to the episcopate during the Pontificate of Pope Gregory XVII (thus belonging to the Friars of the Carmelites of the Holy Face), but by 2016, the number active was supposedly down to 32 bishops. In the same year, the number of Sisters of the Carmelites of the Holy Face was around 40 nuns.

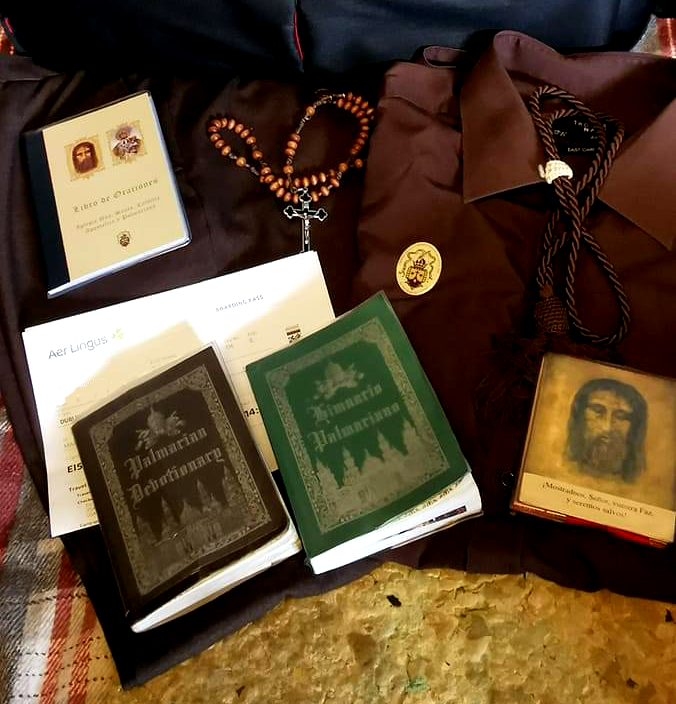
Religious accoutrements of a male Third Order Carmelite of the Holy Face in 2023. Including Palmarian religious books, brown shirt, Holy Face of Jesus scapular and penitential rosary.

Through the Carmelites of the Holy Face, the mystical Carmelite Charism is of great significance for Palmarians; members of the Third Order wear a large variation of the Scapular of Our Lady of Mount Carmel with the Holy Face of Jesus on one side and the unified Sacred Heart of Jesus and the Immaculate Heart of Mary on the other. The men from the order dress in Carmelite brown while attending El Palmar de Troya at feast days and for the religious “Carmelite” as a liturgical colour for certain feasts has been added by the Palmarian Church to its Rite. In their religious documents, the Palmarians accept the traditional mystical narrative of the Carmelites as having been founded by the Prophet Elias on Mount Carmel (succeeded by the Prophet Eliseo). In following with Daniel a Virgine Maria (1615–1678) against the critical claims of the Bollandists, they claim that the Elian Carmelite heritage was identical with that of the Essenes. In their Bible, the Sacred History or the Holy Palmarian Bible, they call many Prophets direct predecessors, “Superior General of the Essenes”, the Israelite “Caudillos” of the Maccabees are also presented as Essenes/Carmelites. The Palmarians glorify the Teresian Reform of St. Teresa of Ávila and St. John of the Cross from the Carmelites of the Ancient Observance into the Discalced Carmelites and consider themselves the true heirs of this tradition. Clemente and Manolo met Mother María de las Maravillas de Jesús, a significant conservative figure of the Spanish Discalced Carmelites and claimed that she told them, "You, one day, will guide the sacred destinies of the Church.” They in turn canonised her as a saint on 17 September 1978 in the Fourteenth Papal Document of Pope Gregory XVII.

Over the years, there have been Palmarians active in many different countries all over the world. In the late 1990s, there were Palmarian chapels in the following places (typically in the homes of lay members); in Spain (El Palmar de Troya, Seville, Granada, Bermeo, Hernani, La Bañeza, Barcelona, Gran Canaria, Madrid, Oliva, Sabadell, Santander & Valencia), in England (London, Southport & Manchester), in Scotland (Hamilton), in Ireland (Belfast, Dublin, Gorey, Thurles & Portaferry), in Italy (Cengles village of Lasa & San Candido), in Germany (Augsburg, Berlin, Bottrop, Delbrück, Grafing bei München, Kempten, Mainz, Niederschopfheim, Nonnenbach & Unterschwandorf), in Switzerland (Aadorf, Andermatt, Jaun & Oberwil), in Liechtenstein (Triesenberg), in Austria (Böhlerwerk, Hollenstein, Kitzeck, Leonding, Ludersdorf, Mittlern, Oberperfuss, Salzburg, Sollenau & Virgen), in Poland, in Russia, in the United States (Arkdale, Chicago, Livingston Manor, Sonoma, Tacoma & Yelm), in the former Netherlands Antilles (Bonaire & Curaçao), in Australia, in New Zealand, in Argentina (Buenos Aires, Arequito, Deán Funes, Santa Fe, Mar del Plata, Mendoza, Sierra Chica, Tandil & Villa Diamante), in Paraguay (Julián Augusto Saldívar, Ciudad del Este & Villa Elisa), in Peru (Huancayo, Lima, Pisco, Piura & Santa Rosa), in Venezuela, in Nigeria (Abatete, Abuja, Akpim, Asaba, Awkuzu, Enugu, Ihitta Ogada, Lagos & Nguru Mbaise), Kenya (Nguru Dawida, Ngange Nyika, Taveta, Migwani & Wudany), in the Philippines (San Ramón) & in Brazil (Aracaju, Atibaia, Buerarema, Belo Horizonte, Ilhéus, Passo Fundo, Rio de Janeiro, São Paulo & Vitória).

centro	centro	centro
Pope	Bishop	Priest, Deacon

=== Church Triumphant: saints of the Palmarian Church ===
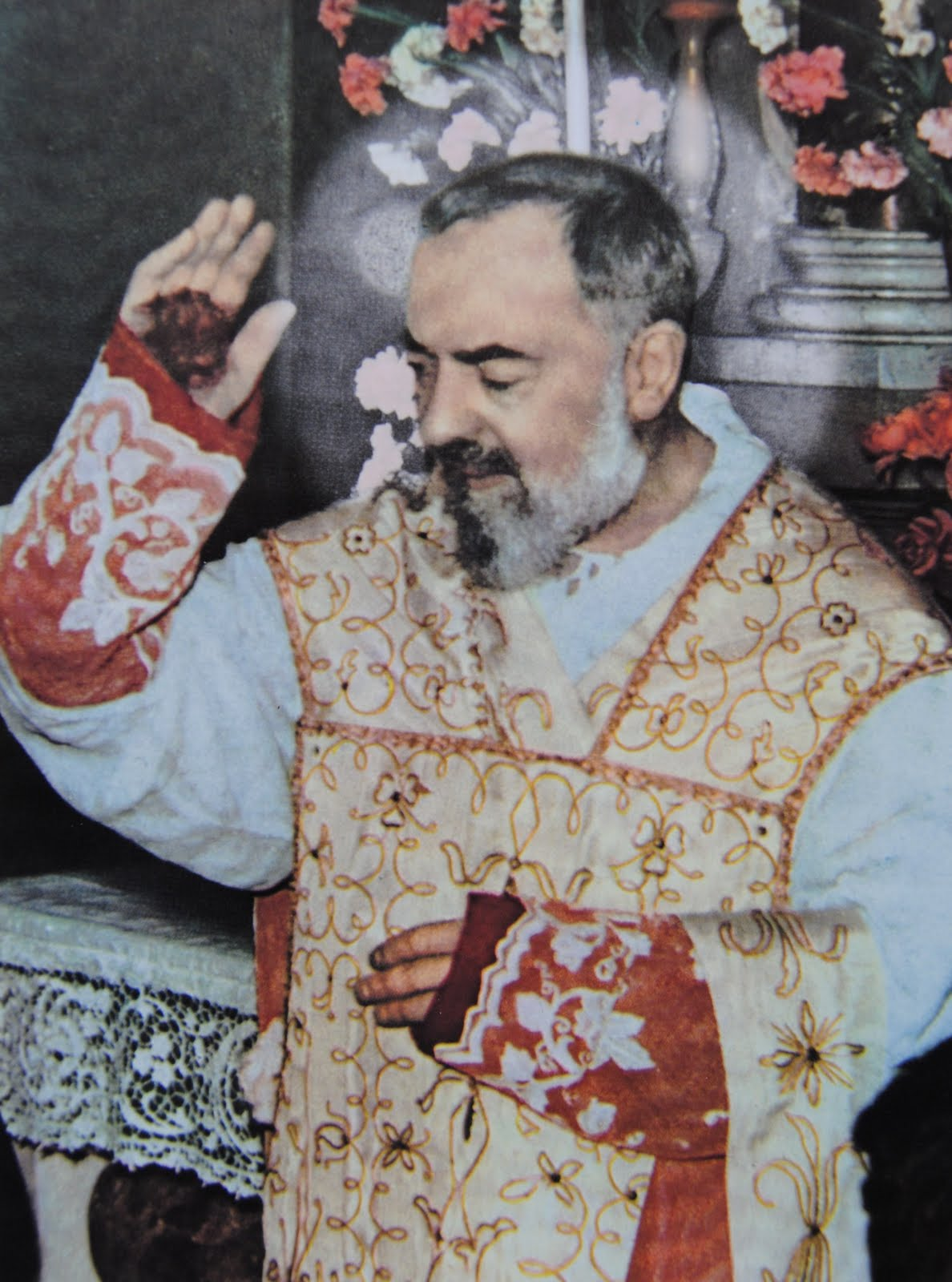
Padre Pio was the first saint canonised by the Palmarian Catholic Church after 1978. He played an important role in the early apparitions of 1968 associated with Clemente.

The Palmarian Catholic Church counts among the saints of the Catholic Church those canonised before 1978 by the Catholic Church, but in addition, have canonised thousands more saints since that time, beginning with Padre Pio in the Tenth Document of Pope Gregory XVII on 12 September 1978. Most of this activity is due to Pope Gregory XVII, who stated in a 1987 document that he had canonised 2,164 saints, not including his canonisations of several "innumerable" classes of martyrs. The most complete recorded collection of names of Palmarian saints is covered in the Palmarian Lives of the Saints (2012).

Of the 263 popes Gregory XVII recognised as his predecessors, he canonised all but 7 of those not previously raised to the altars. The Historical Review of all the Popes who have shepherded Holy Church founded by Our Lord Jesus Christ, based on Gregory XVII's visions and defined under anathema by Gregory XVIII to be truth revealed by God, asserts that Clement V, Clement VI, Alexander VI, Leo X, Paul IV, and Clement XIV are in hell, Boniface VII will be in purgatory until the end of time, and all the other popes are in heaven, of whom 110 were detained in purgatory. The popes said to be damned are titled "Reprobate" by analogy to "Saint," as in "Reprobate Clement XIV." The Historical Review also extends the epithet "the Great," conventionally used of three or four popes, to a total of 147 popes, with the Apostle Peter known as "the Very Great," and various other epithets such as "the Peacemaker" and "the Convert" assigned, often in combination with "the Great." Non-popes incidentally asserted to be in hell within the Historical Review include Philip IV of France, Martin Luther, Henry VIII, the Marquis of Pombal, Louis XV, Charles III of Spain, and Jean-Marie Villot.

Historical Catholic rulers, particularly monarchs were canonised including: Charlemagne, Philip II of Spain, Pelagius of Asturias, Alfonso X of Castile, Isabel I of Spain, Mary, Queen of Scots, Élisabeth of France, Charles of Austria and Ferdinand the Holy Prince, but also a president of a republic: Gabriel García Moreno (from Ecuador). In addition to this, the Palmarian Church canonised Christopher Columbus, who, sponsored by the Catholic Monarchs is popularly known as a leading figure in the European Discovery of the Americas, led by the Spanish Empire (the entire Twenty-Eighth Document of Pope Gregory XVII is dedicated to this).

One large category of people who were canonised are the Martyrs of the Spanish Civil War (or in official Palmarian parlance, the "Holy Martyrs of the Holy Crusade Against Marxism in Spain"), which included a large number of bishops, priests and nuns who were killed during the Red Terror in Spain. Hundreds of named individuals were canonised, including a number of political figures, such as Francisco Franco (Caudillo of Spain), Luis Carrero Blanco, José Antonio Primo de Rivera and José Calvo Sotelo. In addition, Gregory XVII canonised an "innumerable" group of people who fought on the nationalist side; although he categorised the war as a crusade, Gregory stated that not everybody who died on the nationalist side was a martyr or motivated by the defence of Christianity. In 1980, the Palmarian Church declared that Francisco Franco was now a co-patron saint of Spain, alongside James the Great and Teresa of Ávila.

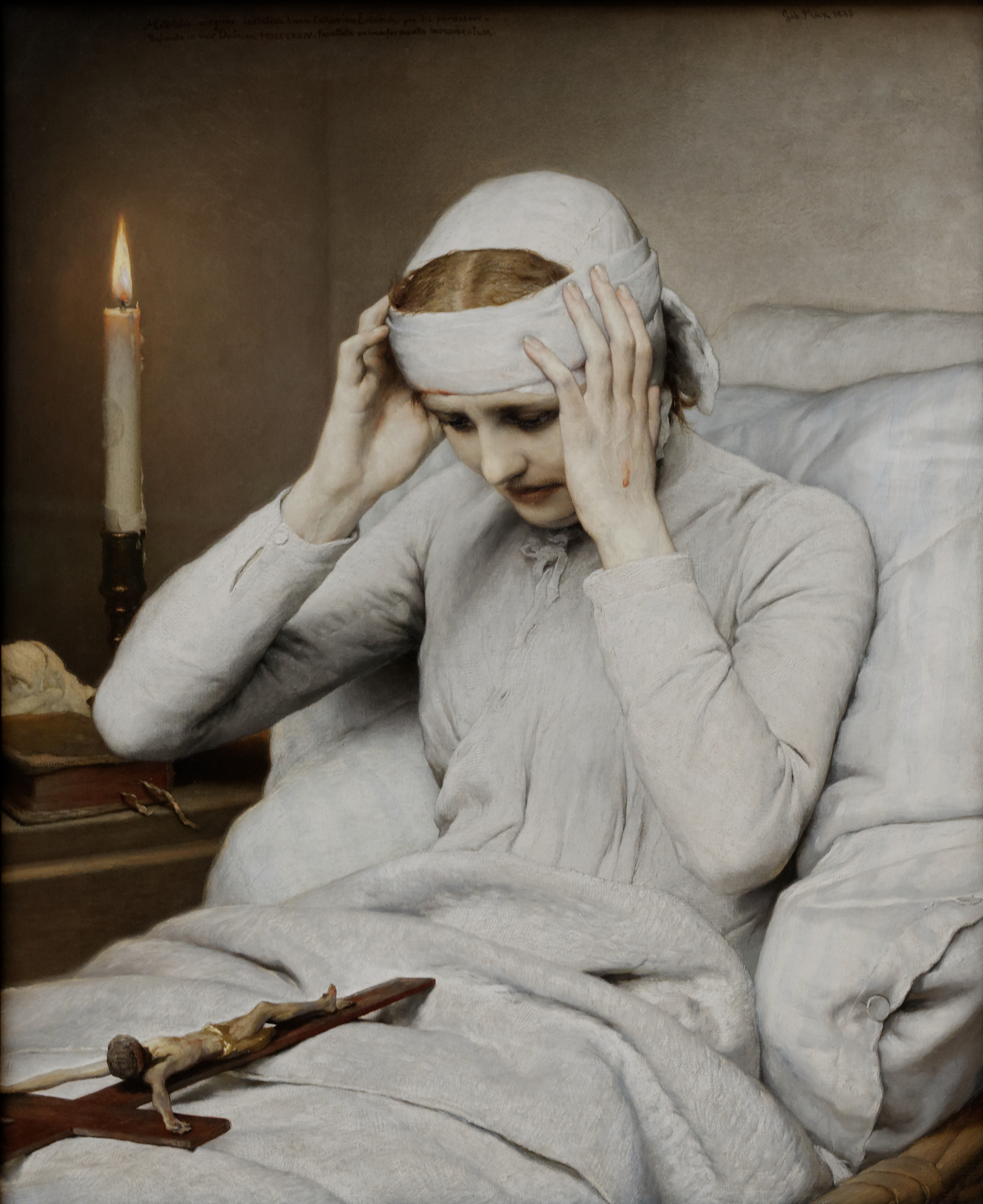
Anna Katharina Emmerich was canonised and declared a Doctor of the Church. Her Marian visionary works were a significant factor in influencing Palmarian doctrine.

There were other large groups of people who were canonised from certain periods of history, including an "innumerable" group of Irish Catholic Martyrs who died in defence of the Catholic faith under Anglo-Protestant rule. Closely related to this were the Catholic Martyrs of England and Wales who were martyred during the 16th and 17th centuries under Protestantism, the names of many of whom are listed as canonised the Papal documents of the Palmarian Church. Missionaries who in the Far East who died for the Catholic faith were also canonised in groups, such as the Martyrs of China, the Martyrs of the Boxer Rebellion and the Martyrs of Indochina (including Vietnam, Laos and Cambodia). The Martyrs of the French Revolution are listed, including a large number of people who were killed by the revolutionaries around the time of the War in the Vendée and in the September Massacres, as well as the Martyrs of Orange. Saints from modern times canonised by the Palmarians include: Faustina Kowalska, Maximilian Kolbe, Josemaría Escrivá and Teresa Benedicta of the Cross. Various Catholic mystics, seers and visionaries, particularly those associated with Marian and apocalyptic themes, were also canonised, including: Girolamo Savonarola, María de Jesús de Ágreda, Anna Katharina Emmerich, Marie Julie Jahenny, Anna Maria Taigi, the seers of Fátima (Francisco and Jacinta Marto), the seers of La Salette (Maximin Giraud and Mélanie Calvat), as well as the medieval Ramon Llull.

An internet hoax claiming that the Palmarians had canonised Adolf Hitler originated on a fabricated Palmarian blogging site and was disseminated through Wikipedia and other media; the Palmarian Catholic Church has denied the claim. According to the religious studies scholar Magnus Lundberg, the leadership of the Palmarian Catholic Church treat the continued spread of the hoax as evidence that the media and the internet have been coopted by enemies of the church.

== Social and cultural issues ==
=== The Norms of Christian Decency ===
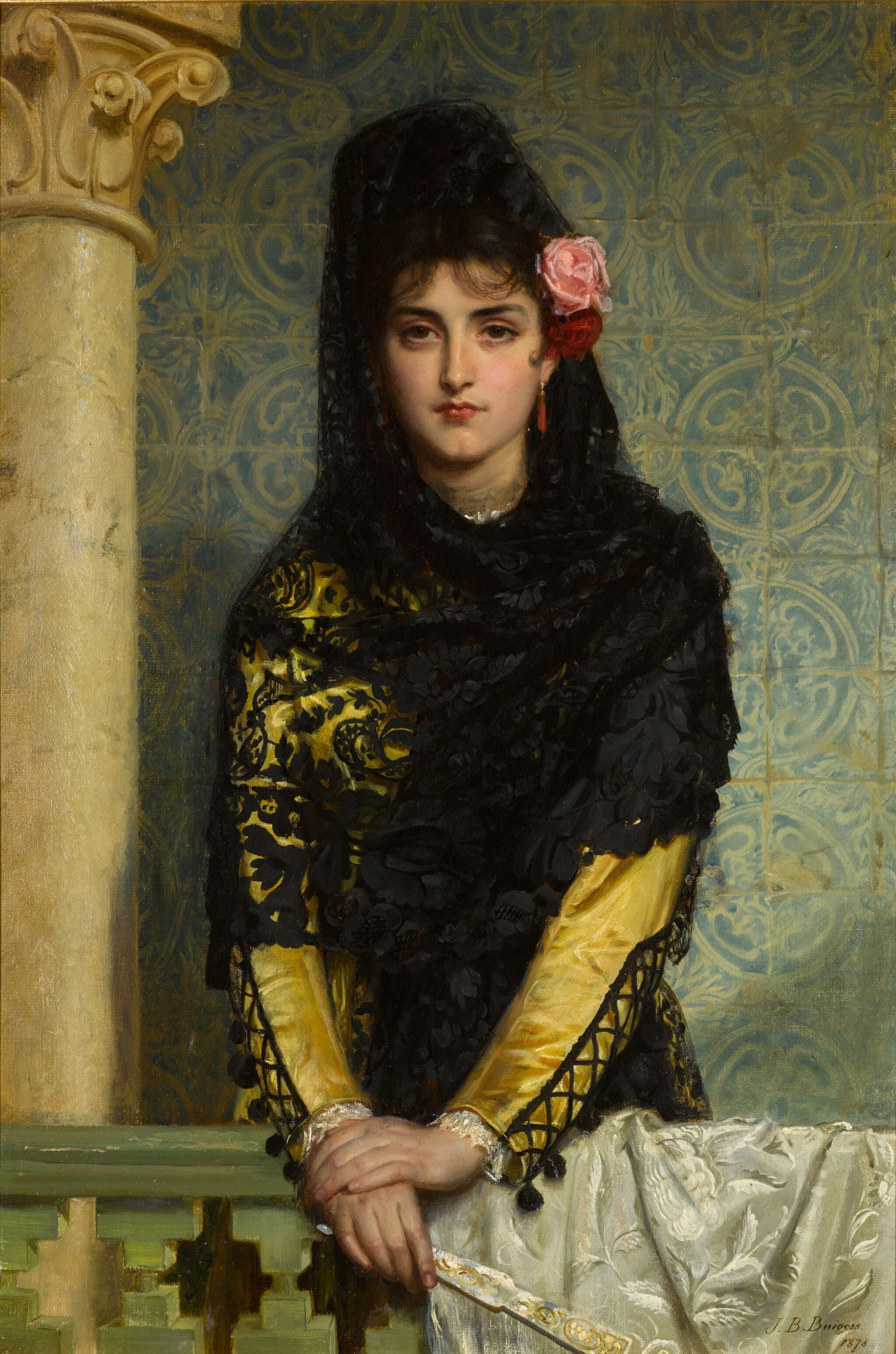
A 19th century painting of a Spanish lady wearing a mantilla. Palmarian women are required to wear a similar garment in the church.

In the Palmarian Catholic Church, for members to remain in good standing with the Holy See they are required to adhere to and uphold compulsory moral norms, ranging from standards of dress to media consumption and matters of social interaction, which are laid out in what is called "The Norms of Palmarian Christian Decency" (abbreviated as "The Norms"). Violations of the Norms were initially treated as a mortal sin, but by the early 2000s became an excommunicable offense, cutting the offender off from the community and depending on severity, required either their confessor or the Pope to lift it. The Norms were first published in 1985 by Pope Gregory XVII, but has expanded over time. In their documents, including during the reign of Pope Peter III, the Palmarians argue that in upholding these Norms, they are only doing what the Catholic Church has always done, with the Supreme Pontiff having the authority in Catholic moral theology of "binding and loosing" (to pass judgement on matters of church discipline relating to faith and morals). They point to the Index Librorum Prohibitorum (Index of Forbidden Books), which was enforced from 1560 to 1966 and claim that modern society is far more corrupt and depraved today, thus requiring even stricter rules to guard morality.

In matters of dress, the Palmarians are required to dress modestly, to avoid occasions of sin. The standards are laid out in a publicly available document, which even non-Palmarian visitors to the Cathedral-Basilica of Our Crowned Mother of Palmar are required to comply with. Men must wear long trousers (shorts are not permitted, only boys under 14 years old are permitted to wear short trousers below the knee), shirts must be long-sleeved and completely buttoned up, no designs or lettering are allowed and none of these items may be too close fitting. Denim cloth was once completely banned, but is now just banned in church buildings (the same applies to sports shoes). Women are required to wear dresses or skirts at all times (trousers are categorised as men's clothing and to wear them is considered transvestitism). Dresses have to be long-sleeved down to the wrist and at least up to the base of the neck (no low necklines are allowed and when seated nothing of the knees must be shown, these cannot be close fitting). The same applies to skirts and blouses. Women must wear stockings up to the knee, girls under 14 may wear socks. To enter church, women must wear a veil (this is commonly in the mantilla-style). This dress code must be adhered to regardless of place or temperature.

Among other things, Palmarians may not frequent places categorised as indecent, such as public swimming baths, beaches, discos and night clubs. Voting in elections is banned. Palmarians may not attend any non-Palmarian religious services, including any social functions connected to them. Palmarians are discouraged from social interaction with those not dressed according to the Norms and while at work, with non-Palmarians, are encouraged to only discuss matters relating to the job at hand (since 2016, this has been relaxed as social contact by phone or letter with non-Palmarians is permitted). The only reading material allowed is religious books approved by the Holy See in El Palmar de Troya (in recent times Pope Peter III has permitted a small number of adventure books for light entertainment). Apostates from the Palmarian Church may not be contacted at all, all photos of Ex-Palmarian clergymen must be destroyed. It is not permitted to contact persons living in adulterous relationships (including cohabiting relationships). Sex education is not permitted, contraception is banned (including natural family planning), courtship and marriage must be with another Palmarian only. Men and women must sit separately in church. During the reign of Pope Peter II, Palmarians were instructed to destroy their TV sets, videos, mobile phones and internet to protect themselves from the "repugnant moral leprosy rampant in the world." In more recent times, in a limited fashion, mobile phones and internet are permitted. Having an organ transplant or leaving organs to be transplanted is banned. Birthday candles on cakes, Christmas trees and lights are banned, whereas Nativity scenes are encouraged. Parents may instead give their children presents on Epiphany (also known as Little Christmas), on 6 January instead, but they cannot say they are from "Santa Claus".

Holy Palmarian Norms are practically the same as that Index of Forbidden Books, but as at present faith and good morals are attacked by way of cinema, television, fashions, internet, books, schools, and so on, the Pope, and heads of families, are compelled to forbid more than before, so as thus to safeguard their children’s souls from filth. Let parents remember that their duty to bring their children up well is very grave before God. They cannot allow their souls to be poisoned by instruments of depravity which attack God, sound Doctrine, Catholic Morals – all propagated by international freemasonry.

— Pope Peter III, Twenty-Second Apostolic Letter, 8 December 2021.

=== Pronouncements on political philosophies ===
The Palmarian Church has made public statements in Papal documents on various political philosophies and where relevant, has condemned what it holds as contradicting the Catholic faith and an integralist Christian social order. Above all, the great bête noire in Palmarian pronouncements on modern society and politics is Freemasonry. The term is used beyond the narrow scope of literal freemasons in Masonic Lodges and extends to all philosophical and political expressions of liberalism. Freemasonry, which is portrayed as Satanic in nature, is accused of being the origin of both capitalism and communism, which, in their own ways, undermine God, the Christian conception of society and erect in its place a secularised and materialist world. Within this scheme, Protestants and others "heretical sects," are supposedly allied with unconverted Jews against the Mystical Body of Christ.

Pope Leo XIII, declared "the Great", has been canonised and proclaimed a Doctor of the Church by the Palmarian Church and they champion his Catholic social teaching based on Rerum Novarum. Pope Gregory XVII anathematised and excommunicated the "errors of capitalism." He declared that these errors had "brought corruption", that many capitalists belonged to masonry, that many capitalists invest money in support of pornography and anti-Christian propaganda. The Palmarian Church teaches that capitalists can be denied communion of the Blessed Sacrament if it is publicly known that they defraud their workers of a fair wage (as one of the sins that cry to Heaven for Vengeance). The Palmarian Church condemned Marxism and declared that they "excommunicate all the members of the church affiliated with Marxism or Communism, and as well all sympathisers with the perverse doctrine; also whoever engage in dialogue with those who declare themselves to be militant atheists," hundreds of Catholics persecuted by communists have been canonised by them, including Cardinal József Mindszenty and Pope Gregory XVII consecrated Russia to the Immaculate Heart of Mary on 22 August 1978. The Palmarians also condemned the "evil national socialism of Hitler" and its "anti-Christian character" (for its "racial idolatry and omnipotence of the state") and it has canonised Catholics persecuted by them such as Rupert Mayer, Titus Brandsma, Maximilian Kolbe and Teresa Benedicta of the Cross.

We declare that capitalism is brother of marxism. Both fight against God. Both corrupt the world. Both poison mankind. Capitalism and marxism are the two extremes which meet at the apex: both are works of masonry, and masonry is the work of Satan. As we know, Satan is the ape of God. As he is an ape, he apes the things of God for his own benefit. God has founded the Church, One, Holy, Catholic and Apostolic, which forms the Mystical Body of Christ. Satan has founded masonry, in which are incorporated marxists, capitalists, protestants and other heretical sects. All this apparatus forms one Mystical Satanic Body called Sionism, to which pertain the perfidious Jews, the deicide race, accursed.

— Pope Gregory XVII, 24 October 1978.

=== Teachings on non-Palmarian religions ===
In stark contrast to post-Vatican II Rome, the Palmarian Church is strongly opposed to religious liberty, ecumenism and interreligious dialogue (all of which are portrayed as a Masonic conspiracy, launched by Satan). Within the Twenty-Eighth Document of Pope Gregory XVII, it explicitly states that "Popes should launch holy Crusades against the heretics, until either they are converted or disappear persecuted to the ends of the earth. He who permits the adoration of false gods or the practice of false religion stands opposed to God."

A long list of "false" positions generally and religious views are systematically condemned in the Papal documents of the Palmarian Church. The Palmarians state that there has been excessive abuse of the phrase "separated brethren" to describe sects which broke away from the "true" Catholic Church, leading to confusion, thus these groups should be referred to instead as heretics and schismatics. It admits, that, of all sects outside of the Catholic Church, the Eastern Orthodox are doctrinally the closest, but contain errors, that they need to accept the filioque and that they should be called the "Heterodox Church" until they change this and unite themselves under the universal jurisdiction of Supreme Pontiff at El Palmar de Troya.

In the Second Vatican Council, of unhappy memory for the Church, was promulgated the cursed law of religious liberty in open opposition to Holy Scripture, in flagrant contradiction to the common teaching of the great and holy Doctors, in brazen contempt of the Infallible Magisterium of the Church. This cursed and monstrous law of religious liberty is opposed to the definitions of innumerable predecessors of Ours. Speaking of contumacious heretics, Saint John the Evangelist says: "With heretics, do not break bread." These words of God suffice to invalidate and anathematize the law of religious liberty promulgated by the Second Vatican Council.

— Pope Gregory XVII, Thirty-Seventh Document.

Non-Christian worldviews and religious teachings such as atheism, paganism, "Mohammedanism" (though Palmarian Popes have stated that Catholics should match their fanatical dedication to religion) and Rabbinic Judaism are also condemned. The Fourth and Thirty-Eighth Documents of Pope Gregory XVII proclaim that "unconverted Jews" are explicitly the "deicide people" and "perfidious" until they become Catholic. Despite this strong criticism, Pope Gregory XVII admitted to some Jewish admixture in the Spanish nation (and likely in his own distant ancestry) and did not see this as problematic. Leading only to further justification for a fervent endorsement of Spanish nationalism; for Domínguez, Spain could legitimately claim a connection to the Old Covenant Israelites through the Sephardim and now that had been superseded by the New Covenant of Jesus Christ, the Spanish nation remained loyal to God as the zealous bulwark of the One, Holy, Catholic and Apostolic Church through the Reconquista, into the Counter-Reformation, fending off Protestantism and Freemasonry, and now had been gifted the Papacy at El Palmar de Troya, after the apostasy of Rome itself.

The Palmarian Church claims that the Pope has supreme spiritual power and temporal power, all the world being subject to him, that the Pope can distribute lands, depose kings and appoint kings. Citing as a clear historical example of this, it points to Pope Pius V's Regnans in Excelsis in which he excommunicated and deposed Elizabeth Tudor ("pretended Queen of England"). As part of their eschatological beliefs, the Palmarian prophecies, linking in with the concept of the Great Catholic Monarch, foretells of the literal establishment of a great Hispanic-Palmarian Empire, over which the Palmarian Pope will reign as Emperor and fight the Antichrist. A specific Palmarian exercise of the power to depose and appoint kings, is denoted in the Twenty-Eighth Document, in which Pope Gregory XVII admits that Pope Hadrian IV had granted Ireland to England as an evangelising power, but the moment the English Crown fell into heresy, it forever lost sovereignty over her and now "since Ireland has no Catholic King, the Pope holds direct power over her until he provides a Catholic king."

== See also ==
- Apostles of Infinite Love
- Conclavism
- Old Catholic Church
- Sedevacantism
