= Camilo Estévez (bishop) =

Spanish bishop

Camilo Estévez Puga de Maside (died 1999), known by the religious name Fr. Leandro María de la Santa Faz, was a bishop of the Palmarian Catholic Church. For many years he was in a prominent leadership position, as fourth in the Palmarian hierarchy. He was ordained a Roman Catholic Priest in Galicia, Spain and consecrated a bishop for the then Carmelite Order of the Holy Face on January 11, 1976, at El Palmar de Troya, Spain by Roman Catholic Archbishop Ngo Dinh Thuc Pierre Martin.
