= Nectario Maria Pratlong Bonicell Gal =

French-born Venezuelan religious brother

- Born: October 28, 1888; Hyelzas, Lozère, Occitania, France
- Died: October 3, 1986 (aged 97); Caracas, Venezuela
- Citizenship: Venezuelan
- Education: Pontifical Gregorian University
- Scientific career
- Fields: Education, history, cartography, archaeology, paleontology, geography, geology, mineralogy
- Workplaces: Institute of the Brothers of the Christian Schools

Nectario Maria Pratlong Bonicell Gal (28 October 1888 – 3 October 1986), born as Louis Alfred Silvano Pratlong Bonicell Gal, was a Venezuelan religious brother of the Institute of the Brothers of the Christian Schools. He was noted as an educator, historian, cartographer, archaeologist, paleontologist and geographer. Having spent much of his adult life in Venezuela as part of his activities with the Christian Brothers, he was the author of study works about the history and geography of the nation which became the educational standard in schools throughout the country. A devoted Mariologist, he was associated with promoting two causes in particular, that of Our Lady of Coromoto, Patroness of Venezuela and also that of Our Lady of Palmar in Spain, a series of apparitions to which he was personally a witness.

== Biography ==
=== Background ===
Louis Alfred Silvano Pratlong Bonicell Gal was born in the small village of Hyelzas, Lozère, Occitania, on 28 October 1888 to Silvano Pratlong and María Celestina Bonicel. As a child he was educated by the De La Salle Brothers in Meyrueis, near his hometown. His birth name is sometimes Hispanised as Luís Alfredo Pratlong Bonicell.

=== Education and science in Venezuela ===
Inspired by his Christian Brothers teachers, he decided to enter the novitiate of the De La Salle congregation in 1850, graduating as a teacher at the Lembecq Lez Hall school in Belgium in 1907. He took the religious name Nectario María. After formation, he was sent to Latin America where he would become most notable for his activities. Firstly, he lived in Panama, teaching at Catholic schools there, before being sent to Venezuela on 13 March 1913. When he arrived there, he was tasked with participating in the foundation of a new De La Salle School in Barquisimeto, where he made perpetual vows in 1917.

From the Pontifical Gregorian University in Rome in 1918, he obtained certificates of study in theology and the sacred sciences. His speciality was history and geography, teaching these subjects for 42 years at the De La Salle School in Barquisimeto. Aside from this work with his students, he was also a notable publisher of advanced study works, which became a standard throughout the country; this included his History of Venezuela (Advanced Level), which went through 20 editions and also his Geography of Venezuela (Advanced Level), which went through 16 editions.

Aside from studying and teaching, Brother Nectario also researched in the fields of paleontology and geology in Lara State in the Central-Western Region, Venezuela where he was based. As part of these research studies, in 1936 he discovered the remains of two "megatherians", species of sloth in the Americas from the prehistoric period. During the 1930s, after having graduated as a secondary school teacher in Paris, he was noted for his works as a mineralogist and geologist, contributing to many different historical publications of the day and founded the Centro de Historia Larense, to study history in the Venezuelan state.

== Marian spirituality ==
=== Our Lady of Coromoto ===
While known for his involvement in the sciences, one of the key spiritual interests of Brother Nectario was Mariology and investigating claims of Marian apparitions from around the world. In Venezuela, he was a driving force behind the revival of Marianism and in particular was strongly associated with promoting the cause of Our Lady of Coromoto, who was said to have appeared at Guanare in 1652. Brother Nectario first began writing articles about Our Lady of Coromoto in 1921 in the local De La Salle journal Excelsior and subsequently asked his superiors to be able to visit Guanare to investigate the archives and the sight on the plains, despite the threat of contracting malaria. He was permitted by Aguedo Felipe Alvarado Liscano, the Bishop of Barquisimeto for the investigation and uncovered manuscripts while there. This campaign led to the Venezuelan episcopate declaring Our Lady Patroness of Venezuela in 1944 and gained the approval of the Holy See during the pontificate of Pope Pius XII.

As a consequence of his historical work and investigations into Our Lady of Coromoto, Brother Nectario was made a member of the National Academy of History of Venezuela in 1929. He was the General Director of the Coromoto Project for many years, which helped to promote the construction of a national monument to Our Lady of Coromoto with the Basilica of the National Shrine of Our Lady of Coromoto, the Episcopal Palace of the Roman Catholic Diocese of Guanare, as well as two hotels in Guanare to facilitate pilgrims visiting the shrine of the Patroness of Venezuela.

=== Our Lady of Palmar ===
Brother Nectario on many different occasions visited Spain as part of his general historical research activities, as the General Archive of the Indies was held in Sevilla (of particular interest to his writings on the history of Venezuela during the times of the Spanish colonisation of the Americas).

While in Sevilla, Brother Nectario's attention was drawn to an alleged contemporary apparition of the Blessed Virgin Mary at a village known as El Palmar de Troya, near Sevilla. Here, on 30 March 1968, four school girls reported having seen the apparition of "a very beautiful lady" on a bush (lentisco) near the Alcaparrosa field, while they were picking flowers. Many other people were drawn to the place and also reported to being seers, witnesses to the apparations and miracles, in what would come to be known as the apparations of Our Lady of Palmar. By early 1969, the attention on the apparations had died down a little, but two articles published in the summer in the ABC newspaper, defending the supernatural nature of the events at Palmar with documentary evidence were published, reinvigorating attention; one by a Jesuit priest and one by Brother Nectario, then an octogenerian. The latter invited readers to a talk he was to give on the topic at the Le Salle Institution in Sevilla. Two of the visitors to the talk, Clemente Domínguez y Gómez and Manuel Alonso Corral, who had visited El Palmar de Troya in 1968 but had become disaffected and stopped attending, were further convinced of their legitimacy and vowed to begin attending again.

On 15 August 1969, when a number of mystical ecstasies of visionaries had gathered there, Brother Nectario reported to have had a vision of Jesus Christ, proclaiming "Christ is present here!" Having been convinced by Brother Nectario of the veracity of Palmar and then witnessing intense alleged miracles for themselves, from this point on Clemente and Manolo visited far more frequently and indeed would soon push their way to the forefront, with Clemente claiming many visions and miracles, such as the stigmata throughout 1969. It was not just in spiritual matters, but also financial, that the well connected Brother Nectario made prominent moves for the Palmarians, as according to Magnus Lundberg, "Nectario María would have an essential role as a facilitator of contacts with potential donors and became responsible for the group’s finances for some time."

Eventually, distance grew between Brother Nectario and Manolo and Clemente, who would eventually found the Carmelites of the Holy Face, which, after the death of Pope Paul VI would proclaim itself as the Palmarian Catholic Church.

== Works ==
- Historia Elemental de Venezuela (1927)
- Historia Superior de Venezuela (1929)
- Historia General de Venezuela (1929)
- Geografía de Venezuela (1929)
- Historia de la Conquista y Fundación de Caracas (1967)
- La maravillosa historia de Nuestra Señora de Coromoto (1975)
- La Virgen del Valle de Margarita: un gran santuario Mariano de Venezuela (1986)

== See also ==
- Catholic Church in Venezuela
- Visions of Jesus and Mary
