= Palmarian Bible =

2001 Bible of the Palmarian Catholic Church

The Holy Palmarian Bible
- Full name: The Sacred History, or, Holy Palmarian Bible According to the Infallible Magisterium of the Church
- Abbreviation: SH
- Complete Bible published: 2001
- Textual basis: Latin Vulgate · Septuagint
- Translation type: Mystical inspiration Instrumentalism
- Copyright: Not sold commercially (freely distributed for all members of the Carmelites of the Holy Face)
- Webpage: www.palmarianchurch.org/holy-palmarian-bible/
- Genesis 1:1–3 Before Universal Creation, only God One and Three existed, or the Divine Essence in Three distinct Persons; Father, Son and Holy Ghost, since They are one very same Infinite and Eternal Nature, and therefore one selfsame unique God. From all eternity, before anything was created, the name of the Eternal Father was "Ananias", the name of the Son or Divine Word was "Melchisedech" and the name of the Holy Ghost was "Malachias". Before God created anything, the idea of each one of every being possible to create was already in the Divine Mind. This idea, in God, is His very Essence. Outside the Triune God then nothing existed since nothing had yet been created. John 3:16 Not applicable, the Four Gospels (including the Gospel of John) are merged into one single narrative Palmarian Gospel.

The Sacred History or Holy Palmarian Bible According to the Infallible Magisterium of the Church (Spanish: Historia Sagrada o Santa Biblia Palmariana según el Magisterio Infalible de la Iglesia) is the religious text of the Palmarian Catholic Church, first published by its Holy See at El Palmar de Troya in 2001. The Palmarian Church claims that the work is the divinely mandated purification of the Latin Vulgate of St. Jerome, and is heavily inspired by the alleged mystical revelations of their founder and first Pontiff Pope Gregory XVII (born Clemente Domínguez y Gómez), rather than being a translation based on academic textual criticism.

The Palmarian Catholic Church claims to be the legitimate successor to the Roman Catholic Church prior to the death of Pope Paul VI in 1978, when Jesus Christ supposedly crowned Domínguez y Gómez Pope in a vision and moved the seat of the Catholic Church from Rome to Palmar de Troya in Spain. Their criticism of Bible editions used by the mainstream Roman Catholic Church began in 1979, when Pope Gregory XVIII anathemised the Jerusalem Bible, a Roman Catholic translation of the Bible published in 1966 based on the historical-critical method, and restored the Vulgate as the official Palmarian scripture. The Jerusalem Bible's publication and replacement of the Vulgate as the primary Bible used by the Roman Catholic Church was perceived as a liberal effort, which was especially unpopular among Catholic traditionalists who form the Palmarian Church's membership..

Starting in 1981, Gregory XVIII purportedly received additional divine visions concerning the supposed corrupt state of existing sacred scripture, with the most direct and specific being one from the Prophet Elias in 1997, who allegedly directed him to begin the project of mystical purification. In the Second Palmarian Council from 1995–2002, the Church concluded that various adulterations, simulations and falsifications within the texts, distorting the word of the Triune God and the true history of the people of God, especially in the Old Testament, had taken place at various junctures when the texts were in the possession of the Jewish people, with the above condemnations and supposed revelations of Gregory XVIII culminating in the Palmarian Bible's publication in 2001. In the New Testament, the Four Gospels are merged into one single Palmarian Gospel, laying out a single authoritative chronology of Jesus Christ's life according to Palmarian dogma.

== History ==
=== Background: The Bible in the Catholic Church ===
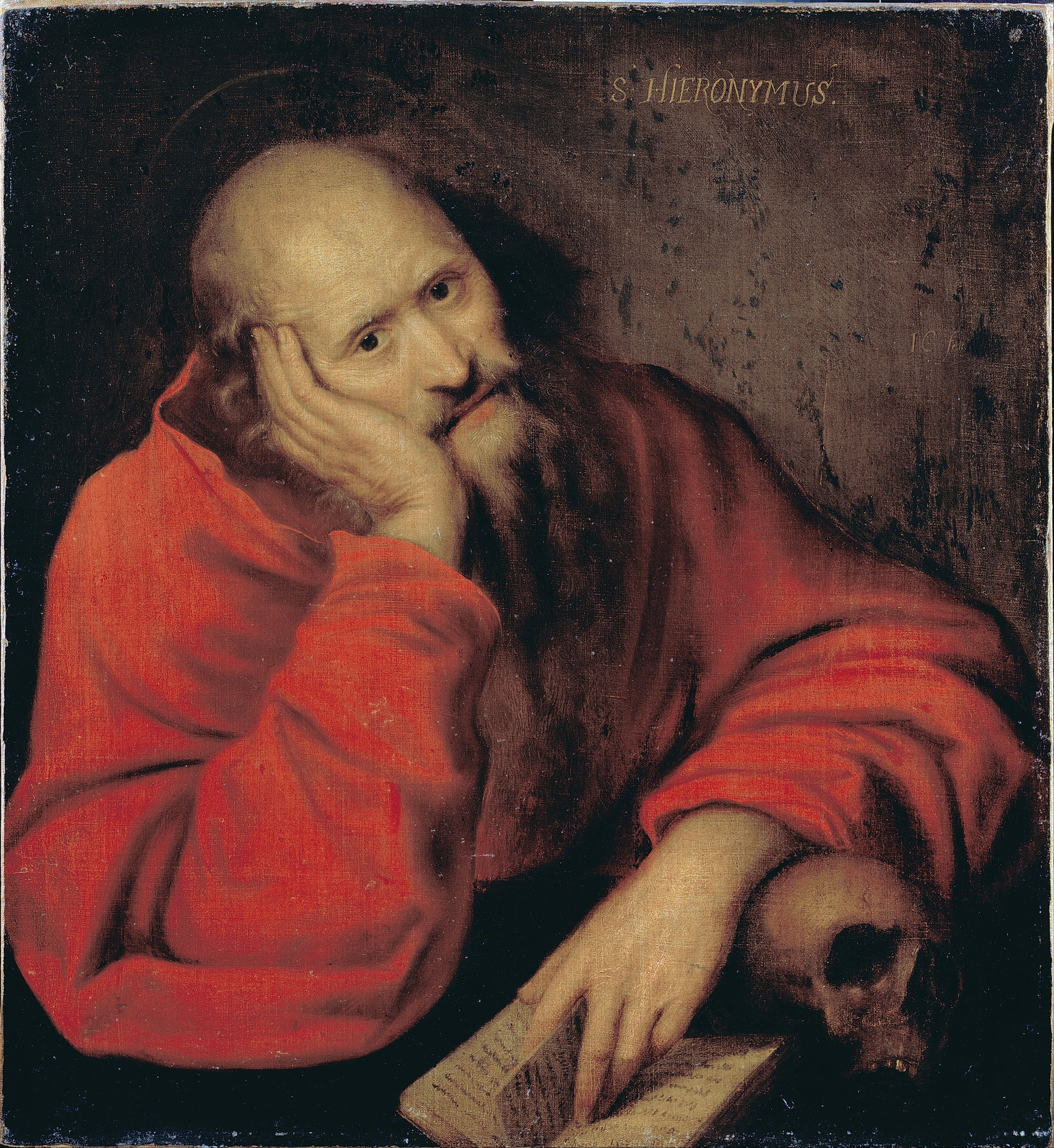
A 16th century painting of St. Jerome in his study. The translation he made of the Bible, called the Vulgate, gained common usage in the Catholic Church.

In the early centuries of Christianity, the Greek-language Septuagint, a translation of the Old Testament from the Biblical Hebrew was first used and formed the basis of texts used by the Christian Church (including the Latin Church). Supposedly, this was originally created in the 3rd century BC at the request of Ptolemy II Philadelphus, Pharaoh of Ptolemaic Egypt and was carried out by seventy translators from the community of the Jews of Alexandria. With the coming of the Christian Church (what Catholics hold to be the Catholic Church), when the Roman Empire was the prevailing political power in the Mediterranean, Latin gradually replaced Greek as the lingua franca and the Septuagint was translated into various different Latin versions known collectively as the Vetus Latina (making them translations of a translation).

Evidence of a complete list of books of the New Testament, which is now considered as canonical, is first found in a letter of Athanasius of Alexandria from 367. For the Church, defining the approved books of the Biblical canon for the single Catholic Bible (including both the Old Testament and New Testament) from a wide range of scriptures that had been passed down was proclaimed at the Council of Rome of 382, presided over by Pope Damasus I. The late 5th century manuscript Decretum Gelasianum, associated with Pope Gelasius I, also affirms this same canon. This canon was reiterated by a number of other synods, such as the Synod of Hippo (393) and the Councils of Carthage (397 and 419), which were ratified by Pope Innocent I. This Biblical canon was confirmed in later ecumenical councils of the Catholic Church, first the Council of Florence (1431) and then the Council of Trent (1545), in the latter of which including the aforementioned books in the Bible was defined as an article of faith for Catholics.

The Council of Trent, an ecumenical council of the Catholic Church, most directly approached the subject of sacred scripture in its Fourth Session on 8 April 1546. The First Decree of this Fourth Session, "Concerning the Canonical Scriptures", dealt with the Canon of Trent and made an explicit list of the books which must be included in a Catholic Bible, on pain of anathema. The Second Decree of the Fourth Session, "Concerning the Edition and Use of the Sacred Books", would declare that, "out of all the Latin editions, now in circulation", the old Vulgate translation in Latin was to be regarded as the authoritative edition for use in lectures, debates, sermons and expositions. Thus, while giving endorsement to the Vulgate from what was then available, it did not preclude that a future, superior Latin edition may supersede it, nor that, before the Vulgate, in the distant past, in the original Hebrew, Aramaic or Greek texts, some no longer available, there may have been a more accurate and definitive text. While carrying a favoured and influential position in the Latin Church, it was not declared as the definitive "official Bible" in the 1917 Code of Canon Law.

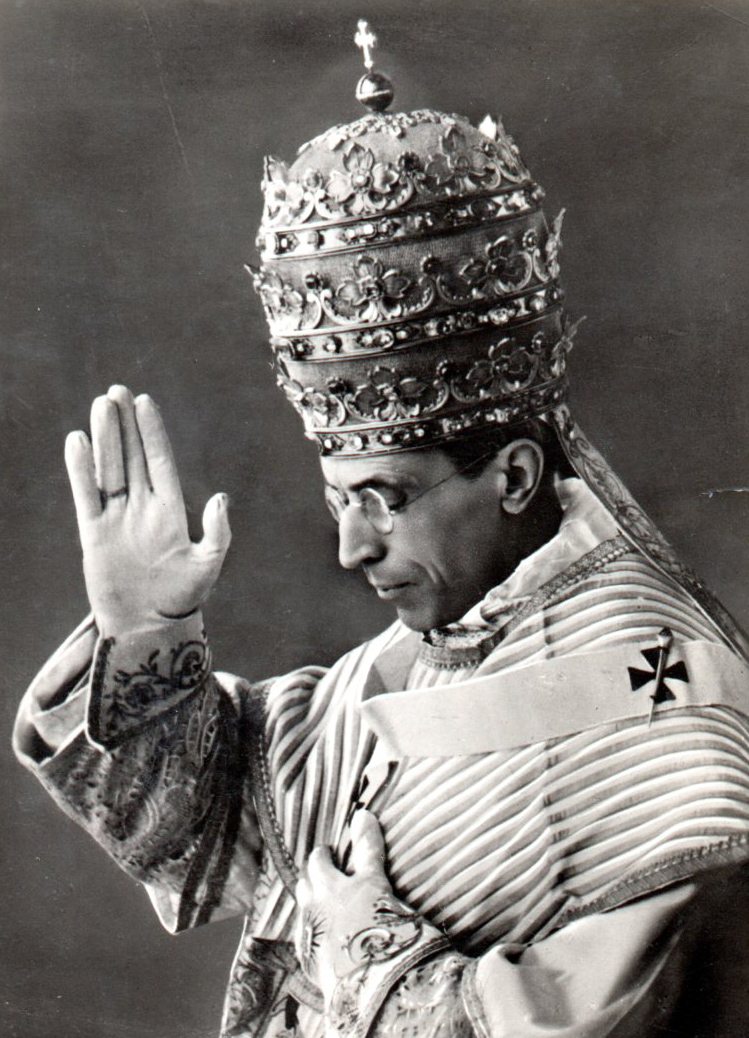
Pope Pius XII's encyclical Divino afflante Spiritu (1943) paved the way for a critical source engagement and revision of the Vulgate within the Catholic Church.

The Catholic Church initially responded cautiously and defensively to the rise of the German liberal Protestant historical-critical method of Biblical criticism, viewing it as a threat to traditional doctrines about the Bible's divine inspiration and authority. In the late 19th and early 20th centuries, Pope Leo XIII's Providentissimus Deus (1893) and Pope Pius X's Pascendi Dominici gregis (1907) condemned the methods of higher criticism, warning Catholic scholars against approaches that treated Scripture merely as a human text or questioned its divine inspiration. However, a significant shift occurred under Pope Pius XII with the 1943 encyclical Divino afflante Spiritu, which opened the door for a more nuanced engagement with biblical criticism and created a pretext for a revision of the Vulgate, as well as use of other source texts. Pope Pius XII encouraged the use of critical methods, including historical and literary analysis, to deepen understanding of Scripture’s original meaning while maintaining its divine inspiration in matters of faith and morals. This encyclical made it possible to for there to be a critical approach to the text of the Vulgate within the scope of the Church, laying the groundwork for both liberal revisions published after the Second Vatican Council by groups which align with the modern Vatican and also the Palmarian "purification" of the text at the opposite end.

=== Scripture in the pontifical documents of Pope Gregory XVII ===
The Palmarian Catholic Church claims that Jesus Christ moved the Holy See of the Catholic Church to the "Mystical Desert" of El Palmar de Troya, Andalusia, Spain, in 1978, in the form of Pope Gregory XVII (born Clemente Domínguez y Gómez), following on from the supposed Great Apostasy of the Roman Catholic Church from the Catholic faith. Domínguez was a stigmatist and mystical seer associated with the alleged apparitions of Our Lady of Palmar. Representing a Catholic traditionalist pushback against the Second Vatican Council, in the early Papal documents of Pope Gregory XVII, released between 1978 and 1980, the Palmarians discuss sacred scripture in several documents. Notably, the Forty-Fourth Document published on 12 December 1979, lionises the Book of Isaias and sees within it prophecies foretelling of the Palmarians in the Last Times of the Church; "The Holy Prophet Isaiah, when he speaks of the last times of the Church of Christ, repeatedly speaks of the Desert, the Holy Mountain, Mount Carmel, and of the Great Pontiff of the Last Times — as well as the great blind one who sees with spiritual eyes: the eyes of the soul" and in addition to this, "The Holy Prophet Isaiah speaks of the need to draw the faithful out of Babylon to avoid contagion, and to lead them to the desert, to the Holy Mountain, to Mount Carmel. The Holy Prophet Isaiah foretells the fall and destruction of the second Jerusalem, the present Rome, the City of the Seven Hills."

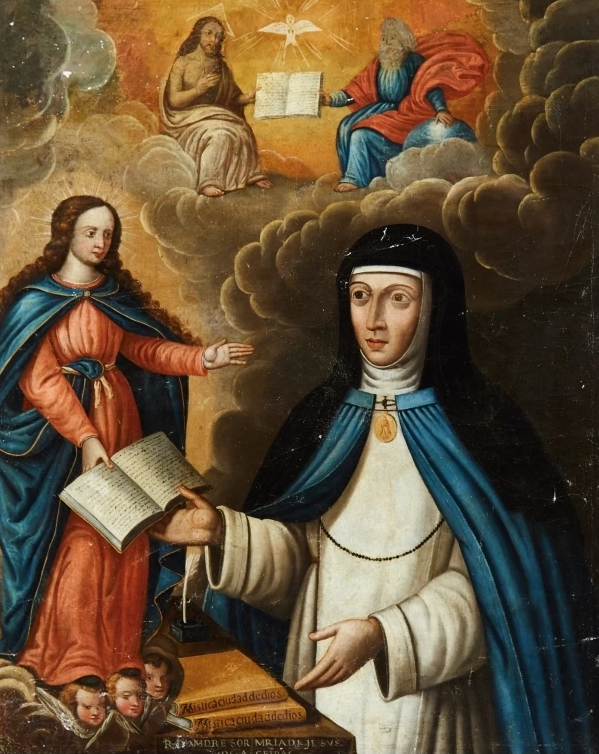
Venerable María de Jesús de Ágreda, author of the Mystical City of God. The revision of the Vulgate was partly informed by the chronology of the Bible she provided.

In the same Forty-Fourth Document, Pope Gregory XVII recommends that the faithful "read from older Bibles, approved by Holy Mother Church before Vatican Council II, and before the terrible pest of modernism, since as you know, modernism is the sum of all heresies and errors." It also discusses some of the more recent translation attempts, which were then being promoted in the Catholic world and declared "We, with the authority with which we are vested, anathematise the famous bible known by the name "Jerusalem Bible", as likewise all bibles similar or parallel to the famous Jerusalem Bible, since in these bibles the progressivists and cursed modernists have introduced heresies and errors. We observe that all these bibles, the fruits of modernism, are designed to turn the Catholic into protestant." One of the central themes of the document was attempting to work out an coherent chronology of the Bible and refers to the Mystical City of God by the Spanish mystic St. María de Jesús de Ágreda, which assigns very specific dates to biblical events, for instance, claiming that Jesus Christ was born in "the year 5,199 of the Creation of the World." In this effort, it seeks to align the chronology with that of the Roman Martyrology. Already, as far back as this document, the Palmarians discuss that there are differences of years between Greek versions of the Bible, such as the Septuagint, the Latin Vulgate and the dates of the Roman Martyrology.

The Palmarians asserted that, when St. Jerome composed the Vulgate, there were several other Latin texts of the Bible in circulation at the time, which he compared to some of the Greek and Hebrew texts, before the Catholic Church chose the Vulgate of St. Jerome as the "most adequate" from what was available. In this document, Pope Gregory XVII claimed that, in reference to the Old Testament, "after the time of Our Lord Jesus Christ, the Jews falsified certain biblical texts, and even concealed and destroyed others, particularly those that better portrayed the Messiah." They claim that, the ordinary Jewish people were sure that the Messiah was near, due to the propehecies, but supposedly, the Scribes and Pharisees "who rejected Christ tried by every means to conceal the clear proofs that that was the time of the Messiah." He claimed that the Jews, "with patience and serenity, with premeditation and malice, took the trouble zealously to lessen the number of years of the patriarchs, to let it appear that the Coming of the Messiah was still far off" and "adulterated the biblical texts", as "the prophets had given signs of the approximate years for the Coming of the Messiah. For that reason the perfidious Jews, that cursed deicide race, changed the years of the biblical chronology in order to hide their monstrous crime, that monstrous crime of deicide." The document ends by declaring "We, as Universal Doctor of the Church, decree: That the Vulgate be revised, and that the chronology be made to conform with the Roman Martyrology."

=== The Holy Ghost, Prophet Elias and purification ===
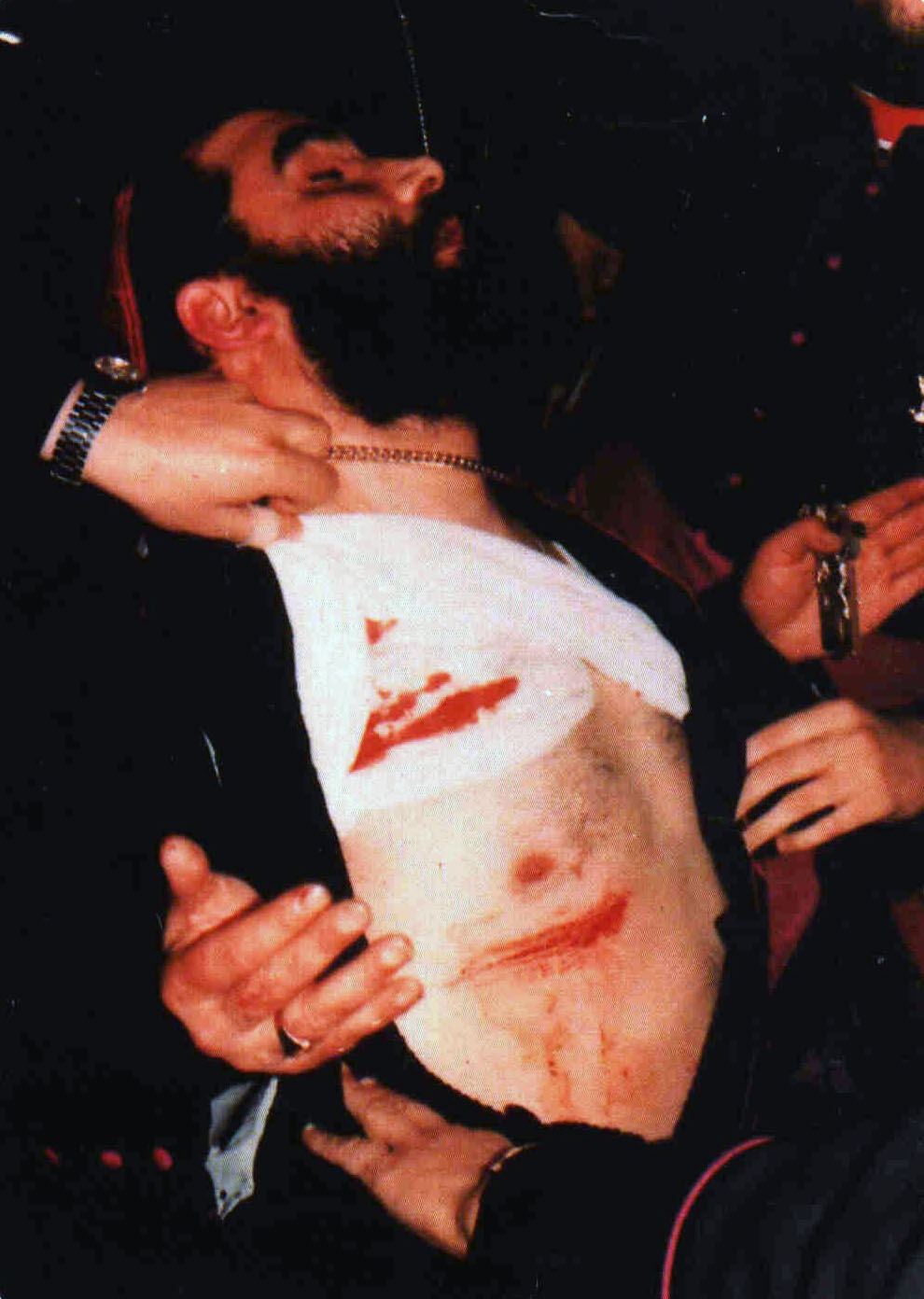
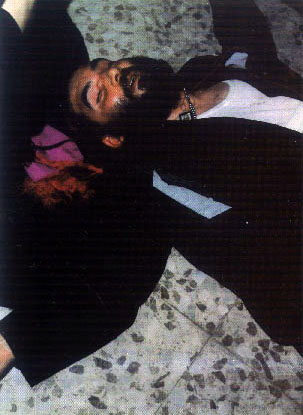
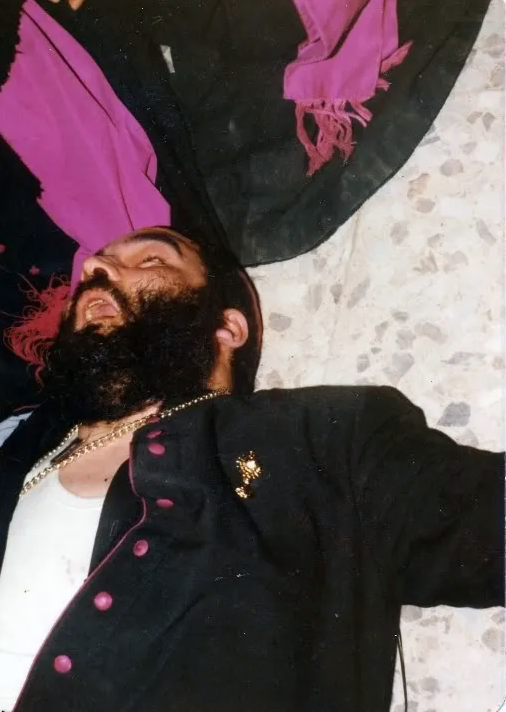
The blind-seer, Clemente Domínguez y Gómez (later Pope Gregory XVII), during a mystical ecstasy, showing visible wounds of the stigmata from the Crown of Thorns and Spear of Longinus.

During the First Palmarian Council, which was held between 1980 and 1992, considered the 21st ecumenical council of the Catholic Church, according to Palmarians (following on from the Vatican Council of 1869–1870), the Treatise on the Mass, which consisted of the Acts of the Council, was gradually published, which consisted of 25 instalments, before culminating in a single volume in 1992. The central focus of this Council, was an allegorical interpretation of the sacred scriputes, drawn from the Latin Vulgate as a reference and inspired by the mystical ecstasies of Pope Gregory XVII, from the perspective of the Holy Sacrifice of the Mass. Already, however, as far back as 21 May 1981, Pope Gregory XVII had reported visions, which revealed that changes had allegedly been made to the extant scriputes in ancient times by the Jews, distorting the word of God. According to this vision, there had been anciently a pure Urtext, which had been written by the Holy Ghost through the hand of the Prophets, but over time, at various historical junctures, the manuscripts had been subverted and what had passed down, whether in the Vulgate, Septuagint or Masoretic Text was no longer the pure word of God, but also included darkness alongside the light.

In 1997, Pope Gregory XVII reported a mystical vision of the Prophet Elias, who appeared to him in his room and allegedly showed him the contents of a book he carried with him, which was supposed to be the pure, undiluted, original version of the sacred scriptures of the Bible, full of complete light, without any of the changes supposed to have been added by Jews in ancient times. The Prophet Elias was highly symbolic, as the Prophet who defended the worship of the "true God," contrary to the worshippers of Baal; the Palmarians uphold the traditional account of the Prophet Elias as the literal founder of the Carmelites on Mount Carmel and their order, the Carmelites of the Holy Face, being the legitimate successors. An ex-Palmarian Bishop, hostile to the Church, has claimed that this vision took place after Clemente had been listening to flamenco music and drinking copious amounts of alcohol in the isolation of his room. As part of the process of the Second Palmarian Council, with the process of the development of this "true version" of the Bible underway, Pope Gregory XVII became far more active in front of his congregation in the years 1998 and 1999, delivering 19 long sermons, which detailed the meaning of these revelations and the current situation of the Palmarian Church, reduced in number, casting himself as the "Apocalyptic Noah" steering the Ark of Salvation of the remnant of true believers.

I saw a large book, and the Holy Ghost with a quill in His beak tracing out writing, and that Book appears entirely full of light. A primitive sacred book appears there, and the Holy Ghost writing directly by way of His Prophets. Further down Saint Jerome appears with his ear-trumpet; he takes up the trumpet and puts it down; he writes, and takes up the trumpet; and the book appears with considerable light and considerable darkness. With the Greek Bible called the Septuagint the same occurs as with the trumpet; and the book appears with light and darkness. The masoretic bible is written by several people, and the same occurs as with the ear-trumpet, for the book appears with light and much darkness; and then upon the Hebrew text, some gestures are seen of jews making capricious changes. Then, below the Most Holy Virgin Mary's visage, appear the following words: "Permission and mystery". Next is seen a book in which all the mysteries appear: only one book was written with full inspiration, and that book no longer exists. Now the Dove with the quill appears writing in the Palmarian Council; the book of the Palmarian Council from beginning to end appears, that is, with all the work this Holy Council has done and will do, and which in its entirety will be the work of the Holy Ghost.

— Message of an alleged vision of Pope Gregory XVII, Mother House of the Carmelites of the Holy Face, Seville, 21 May 1981.

=== Dissention, the Great Expulsion and Archidona group ===
In the Palmarian Catholic Church, there had been a degree of internal unrest and growing discontent since the mid-1990s among the clergy. Some elements did not want the Palmarian Church to move too far away from the conservative 1950s positions of the Catholic Church. Following Pope Gregory XVII's (Clemente Domínguez y Gómez) announcement in 1997, that the Prophet Elias had appeared to him and allegedly said that the enemies of God (elsewhere defined as the Jewish people) had in ancient times corrupted significant parts of the text of the Bible through adding in adulterations, simulations and falsifications to the scriptures, contrary to the true word of God, which now needed to be "purified", the group (later to be known as the Archidona group) grew increasingly concerned. An additional concern was the suppression of the Palmarian College of Cardinals and the solidification of the position of Fr. Isidore (Manuel Alonso Corral), who served as Palmarian Secretary of State, as a clearly defined Papal successor, rather than there being a Papal conclave permitted prepared for the future.

During the Second Palmarian Council, from 1995 to 2002, the Palmarian Bible, also known as the Sacred History or Holy Palmarian Bible (2001), was developed. As this process gathered steam, members of the Palmarian Church (including its Bishops), were expected to hand in their old versions of the Bible, typically the Latin Vulgate, to be destroyed. This caused a significant amount of discontent among the unhappy faction, who protested that they could not even study the Treatise of the Mass which references the Vulgate throughout (this was the result of the First Palmarian Council and until the Sacred History, had served as the pivotal text). On the 5 November 2000, the group of clerics who were discontented with the Palmarian Bible; eighteen Palmarian bishops and seven Palmarian nuns; were anathematised and excommunicated, expelled from the Palmarian properties and declared ex-Palmarian. Ex-Fr. Isaac (José Antonio Perales Salvatella), the former confessor to the Pope was pointed to as the supposed leader of the group and declared a heresiarch, a new Martin Luther, A significant number of the group moved to Archidona, near Málaga (from which they took their name) and continued to proclaim themselves as true Palmarian Catholics, but now sedevacantist, claiming that the Pope had fallen into error and lost the Chair of St. Peter. As part of this, the group rejected changes after 1995 and rejected the new Palmarian Bible in favour of the old Latin Vulgate.

== Books ==
=== Old Testament ===
- The Holy Trinity: (I) God, One in Essence, (II) God, Three In Persons
- Genesis: (I) Universal Creation, (II) The trial of the Angels, (III) Adam's and Eve's trial and sin, (IV) Disastrous consequences of original sin, announcement of Redemption, and Adam's and Eve's repentance, (V) Adam's and Eve's children, (VI) Noah and the universal Flood, (VII) The Tower of Babel, (VIII) The submerging and separation of continents, (IX) The Prophet and Patriarch Job, (X) Patriarchs Abraham, Isaac, Jacob and Joseph, (XI) The Prophet Pastors of the Israelites, (XII) Moses, Prophet, Pastor, Lawgiver, and Caudillo of the People of Israel
- Exodus and Leviticus: (I) The Israelites leave Egypt, (II) God promulgates the Decalogue on Mount Sinai
- Numbers and Deuteronomy: (I) The People of Israel's Journey from Mount Sinai to Cadesbarne, (II) The People of Israel fulfil the divine chastisement of pilgrimaging another twenty years around the Sinai peninsula, (III) Last years of the People of Israel's long pilgrimage through the desert, preparations for entry into the Promised Land
- The Book of Joshua: (I) The People of Israel's conquests in the Promised Land under Joshua's command, (II) Last years of Joshua's life, (III) God's People governed by Caleb, Prophet, Pastor and Caudillo
- The Book of Judges: (I) Authority of the Judges of the People of Israel, (II) The Judges Othoniel and Ahod, (III) The Book of Ruth, (IV) The Judges Samgar, Deborah, Gedeon and Tola, (V) The Judges Jair, Jephthe, Abesan, Elon, Abdon and Samson, (VI) The Judge Samuel
- The Book of Kings and Their Chronicles: (I) Saul, first King of the People of Israel, (II) David, second King of the People of Israel, (III) Solomon, third King of the People of Israel, (IV) Division of the kingdom of Israel into two kingdoms: Judah and Samaria, (V) The Book of Tobias, (VI) The Kingdoms of Judah and Samaria united or reunified kingdom of Israel
- The Wisdom Books of David and Solomon: (I) The Psalms of David, (II) The Book of Proverbs, (III) The Book of Wisdom, (IV) Song of Songs, (V) Ecclesiastes
- The Order of Mount Carmel, The Prophets Elias and Eliseus: (I) The Order of Mount Carmel or Order of the Essenes, (II) The Prophet Elias, Founder and first Superior General of the Carmelites or Essenes, (III) The Prophet Eliseus, second Superior General of the Carmelites or Essenes
- The Prophets called Major: (I) The Prophet Isaias, (II) The Prophet Jeremias, (III) The Prophet Ezechiel, (VI) The Prophet Daniel
- The Prophets called Minor, The Most Holy Prophet Malachias: (I) The Prophet Abdias, third Superior General of the Essenes, (II) The Prophet Jonas, fourth Superior General of the Essenes, (III) The Prophet Micheas, fifth Superior General of the Essenes, (VI) The Prophet Amos, (V) The Prophet Joel, (VI) The Prophet Nahum, (VII) The Prophet Baruch, (VIII) The Prophet Oseas, sixth Superior General of the Essenes, (IX) The Prophet Habacuc, (X) The Prophet Sophonias, (XI) The Prophet Aggeus, (XII) The Prophet Zacharias, (XIII) The Most Holy Prophet Malachias
- The Israelites' Captivity in Babylonian and their return to the land of Israel: (I) The Book of Esther, (II) First Part of the Book of Esdras; Zorobabel, Prophet, Levitical priest and Caudillo of the People of Israel, (III) Second Part of the Book of Esdras; Esdras, Prophet, Levitical priest and Caudillo of the People of Israel, (IV) The Book of Nehemias, (V) Caudilloship of the Essenian Religioso Michael in Israel's territory
- Caudilloship of the Essenian Religioso Machabees in Israel's territory: (I) Mathathias Machabee, Prophet, Levitical High Priest and Caudillo of the People of Israel, (II) Judas Machabee, Prophet, Levitical High Priest and Caudillo of the People of Israel, (III) Jonathas Machabee, Prophet, Levitical High Priest and Caudillo of the People of Israel, (IV) Simon Machabee, Prophet, Levitical High Priest and Caudillo of the People of Israel, (V) John Hyreanus Machabee, Prophet, Levitical High Priest and Caudillo of the People of Israel, (VI) Aristobulus Asmoneus Machabee, Prophet, Levitical High Priest and Caudillo of the People of Israel, (VII) Herold the Great
- Ecclesiasticus

=== New Testament ===
- The Most Holy Virgin Mary, Golden Gate of the New Testament: (I) Most Holy Anne and Joachim, Parents of the Divine Virgin Mary, (II) Joseph Most Holy, Spouse of the Divine Virgin Mary, (III) The Most Holy Virgin Mary, Mother of Our Lord Jesus Christ, (IV) Last years in the life of the Virgin Mary's Parents, (V) Espousal of the Most Holy Virgin Mary to Joseph Most Holy, (VI) Death, Dormition, Resurrection and Assumption of Joseph Most Holy, (VII) Final destiny of the Triple Benediction
- The Holy Gospel of Our Lord Jesus Christ: (I) Conception of the Precursor. Incarnation of the Divine Word. Nativity, Infancy and Hidden Life of Our Lord Jesus Christ, (II) The precursory mission of Saint John the Baptist. The Semi-public Life of Christ. Christ begins His Public Life, (III) From the 5th of March in the year 31 to the 3rd of April in the year 32, (IV) From the 3rd of April in the year 32 to the 25th of March in the year 33, (V) From the 25th of March in the year 33 up till the 24th of March in the year 34, (VI) Institution of the Holy Sacrifice of Mass by Our Lord Jesus Christ in the Cenacle of Jerusalem, (VII) The Passion, Death, Resurrection and Ascension of Our Lord Jesus Christ
- Acts of the Apostles, Life of the Church from the Ascension of Our Lord Jesus Christ until Saint John the Evangelist is rapt up to Mary's Planet: (I) From the Coming of the Holy Ghost until Saul's conversion, (II) From the conversion of Saul to the translation of the Apostolic See to Rome, (III) From the translation to Rome of the Apostolic See from Antioch of Syria until the Transit of the Most Holy Virgin Mary, (IV) From the Transit of the Most Holy Virgin Mary to the conclusion of the Apostles' mission on earth
- Apostolic Epistles: (I) First Epistle of Saint Peter (Year 47), (II) Second Epistle of Saint Peter (Year 66), (III) First Epistle of Saint Paul to the Thessalonians (Year 49), (IV) Second Epistle of Saint Paul to the Thessalonians (Year 49), (V) Epistle of Saint Paul to the Galatians (Year 54), (VI) First Epistle of Saint Paul to the Corinthians (Year 54), (VII) Second Epistle of Saint Paul to the Corinthians (Year 55), (VIII) Epistle of Saint Paul to the Romans (Year 56), (IX) Epistle of Saint Paul to the Ephesians (Year 61), (X) Epistle of Saint Paul to the Philippians (Year 61), (XI) Epistle of Saint Paul to the Colossians (Year 61), (XII) Epistle of Saint Paul to Philemon (Year 61), (XIII) Epistle of Saint Paul to the Hebrews (Year 62), (XIV) Epistle of Saint Paul to Titus (Year 64), (XV) First Epistle of Saint Paul to Timothy (Year 65), (XVI) Second Epistle of Saint Paul to Timothy (Year 66), (XVII) First Epistle of Saint John (Year 65), (XVIII) Second Epistle of Saint John (Year 66), (XIX) Third Epistle of Saint John (Year 73), (XX) Epistle of Saint James the Younger (Year 57), (XXI) Epistle of Saint Thaddeus (Year 57)
- The Apocalypse of Saint John: (I) Vision of Jesus Christ, (II) The Mystical Book of the Seven Seals, (III) The First Seal, (IV) The Second Seal, (V) The Third Seal, (VI) The Fourth Seal, (VII) The Fifth Seal, (VIII) The Sixth Seal, (IX) The Seventh Seal

=== History of the Popes ===
In the Holy Palmarian Bible, the text is presented as a chronological history of the Triune God and those who worship him as the People of God, thus, it consists of the Old Testament (before the coming of Jesus Christ) and then the New Testament, with the coming of the Blessed Virgin Mary, Jesus Christ and the Apostolic age. The third part of the Holy Palmarian Bible, initially published in 2001, is the "Historical Review of All the Popes Who Have Shepherded the Holy Church Founded by Our Lord Jesus Christ", or for short the “History of the Popes.” This picks up the story of the “People of God” (in the Palmarian worldview) since and the leadership of the Church of Christ under the Popes from Peter the Apostle onward, including when the Holy See was at Jerusalem, Antioch, Rome and finally, El Palmar de Troya. In more recent editions, after the death of Pope Gregory XVII, the History of the Popes has instead been published as an ancillary document, rather than being published as part of the Bible, due to it being a living document and requiring constant updating with the reign of each new Pope.

The text contains short biographical assessments, summarising the reigns of each Pope from the Palmarian perspective. Most Popes of the Catholic Church are presented as saints, many with the title "the Great", with the text also dogmatising the Palmarian teaching that six Popes of the Catholic Church are now in hell, the most recent of which being Pope Clement XIV (the Pope who suppressed the Jesuits), who, along with Pope Clement V, Pope Clement VI, Pope Alexander VI, Pope Leo X and Pope Paul IV, is declared "Reprobate." Pope Boniface VII is declared to be in purgatory and has the title of "Venerable Expiator." The text claims that there have been a series of Antipopes running counter to the true Catholic Papacy since the late 16th century, typically installed by rulers of France who conspire to undermine the work of the Catholic Church and since the 1720s, these Antipopes are described as leading Freemasons.

Great Mystic. Stigmatist. Vilely calumniated by order of his successor, perverse Pope Clement XIV. Martyr. Died poisoned by order of his successor, perverse Pope Clement XIV. Apostle of Papal Supremacy in spiritual and temporal orders; of the Most Holy Trinity; of the Excellencies of Our Lord Jesus Christ, true God and true Man; of Jesus ridiculed by the chief priests in the High Priest Caiphas’ residence; of Jesus Crucified affronted by the priests and mobs on Calvary; of Mary Dolorous desolate at the foot of the Cross; of Marian Devotion, of Josephine Devotion; of Saint John the Evangelist Dolorous, desolate at the foot of the Cross and in him the entire Church; of Saint Mary Magdalen desolate on her knees before Christ Crucified at Calvary; of trustingly drawing near to God; of Worship of the Lord’s Sacred Relics, and of Worship of Sacred Relics and Imágenes. Exalted Whip against febronians and other multiple heretics. Signal Hammer against encyclopedists and other satanic ideologists. Firm Staff against obscene publications, pictures and sculptures. Chanter of the Glories of Mary and Joseph. Upright Consul of God. Guide and Master of Peoples. Glorious Upholder of the Company of Jesus. Flailer of defamers. Unoverthrowable Watchtower over Catholic Orthodoxy.

— Example biography of Saint Pope Clement XIII the Great, Historical Review of All the Popes Who Have Shepherded the Holy Church Founded by Our Lord Jesus Christ, 2013.

== See also ==
- Bible version debate
- Bible translation
- Biblical canon
- Book of Mormon
- Quran

== Links ==
- Holy Palmarian Bible
- 12th Report on the Website of the Holy Palmarian Church
