= Ginés Jesús Hernández =

Palmarian Catholic Church pope (born 1959)

Palmarian Pope Gregory XVIII
- Supreme Pontiff of the Palmarian Catholic Church; Patriarch of El Palmar de Troya
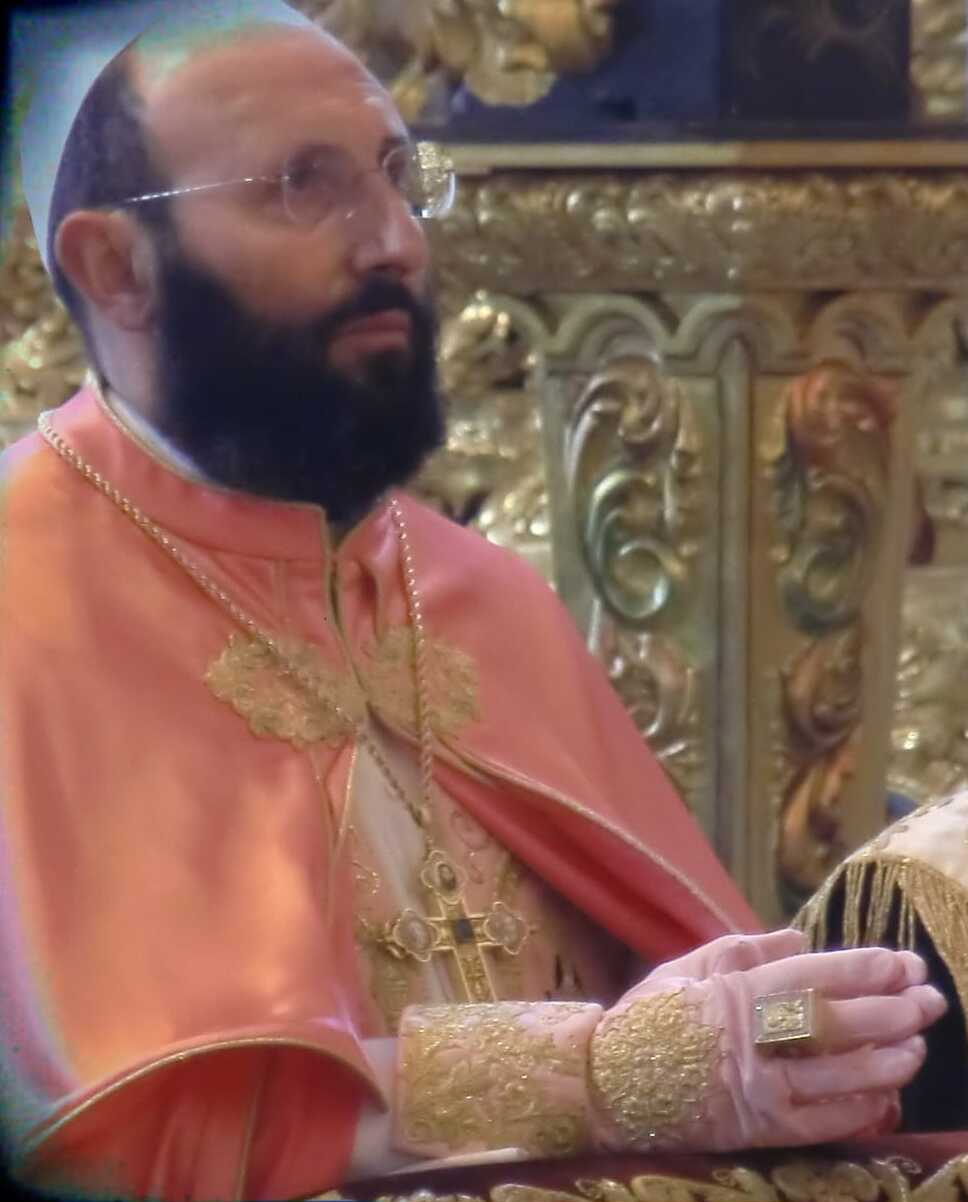
- Papacy began: 15 July 2011
- Papacy ended: 22 April 2016
- Predecessor: Peter II
- Successor: Peter III
- Opposed to: Benedict XVI (2011–2013); Francis (2013–2016)

Orders
- Ordination: 2 December 1984 by Peter II
- Consecration: 2 December 1984 by Peter II

Personal details
- Born: Ginés Jesús Hernández; 1 July 1959 (age 67) Mula, Murcia, Spain
- Denomination: Palmarian Catholic Church (until 2016; claims to be Catholic Church); Roman Catholic Church (2016–present)
- Motto: Recéptor Christi (Receiver of Christ)
- Criminal charges: Armed robbery Aggravated assault Assault
- Criminal penalty: Six years incarceration and a €35,000 fine
- Criminal status: Released on probation

Gregory XVIII (Latin: Gregorius PP. XVIII; Spanish: Gregorio XVIII; born Ginés Jesús Hernández y Martínez; 1 July 1959), also known by the religious name Sergio María de la Santa Faz, was previously the third Pope of the Palmarian Catholic Church, who in this capacity, claimed to be the 265th Pope of the Catholic Church from 15 July 2011 until his abdication on 22 April 2016. (Note: It is difficult to obtain reliable and verified information about the Palmarian sect, according to religious studies scholar Jean-François Mayer, since the sect neither announces news nor had an online presence until 2018. Little is known about what happens inside the sect compound, according to ABC newspaper journalist Alberto Flores, who described the usual behavior of the sect as "habitual secrecy" (habitual ocultismo).) After his abdication, Hernández left the Palmarian Church completely and reconciled with the Vatican, living as a layman.

== Biography ==
=== Background ===
Hernández is a former member of the Spanish military and a Carlist.

Between 2005 and 2011, Hernández served as church secretary of state under antipope Manuel Alonso Corral (Peter II).

After Corral's death, Hernández succeeded Corral, on 15 July 2011, as pope at El Palmar de Troya and adopted the papal name Gregory XVIII. Hernández nominated his successor Joseph Odermatt from Switzerland.

According to Magnus Lundberg, of the University of Uppsala, Hernández abdicated from his papacy on 22 April 2016 and was succeeded by Odermatt, who took Peter III as his papal name.

Following his abdication, Hernández married Nieves Trivedi (a former Palmarian nun) and they both reconciled with the Roman Catholic Church.

=== Apostasy from the Palmarian Church ===
Following his abdication, Hernández told El País that the Palmarian Catholic Church "was all a hoax from the beginning" to profit from believers and supporters of the alleged apparitions of Our Lady of Palmar. His successor, Pope Peter III, published an encyclical letter in response, in which he accused Hernández of discrediting his former Church in his interview and of stealing two million euros from the Palmarian Catholic Church, alongside several goods, including a BMW X6. Peter III subsequently declared Hernández an apostate, excommunicated him and declared all of his acts to be null and void. Hernández denies the charges of stealing.

In May 2016, Hernández gave an interview to El Español in which he stated that he had left the Church not because he had fallen in love, but because he had lost faith in the Palmarian Norms; he also accused his former Church of many abuses, of which his predecessor Peter II was apparently aware, though not sexual scandals, which he firmly denied. He also stated that he lost several friends after leaving the Palmarian Catholic Church.

In 2020 Hernández was again interviewed by El Confidencial: during the interview he accused the Palmarian Catholic Church of possessing large quantities of money and even weapons; he also regretted not disbanding the Church while he was in charge, but predicted that it would soon collapse on its own.

=== Attempted robbery in the cathedral-basilica ===
On 10 June 2018, Hernández and his wife, Nieves Triviño, climbed over the high walls of the Cathedral-Basilica of Our Crowned Mother of Palmar. They were masked and armed, apparently planning to rob the cathedral, but were discovered by a Palmarian bishop who was outside the basilica. According to testimonies, they beat the bishop with a hammer and threatened him and another bishop with a knife. However, in the subsequent fight, Hernández was severely injured while the others escaped with less serious physical injuries.

Hearing the noise outside the cathedral, other church members came to the assistance and they called the police and an ambulance. Hernández was transported by helicopter to the Virgen del Rocio University Hospital in Seville. After recovering, he and his wife were arrested by the Civil Guard. Both were subsequently charged with the accusations of armed robbery, grave assault and assault.

On 17 May 2019, Hernández and his wife were found guilty of all charges and sentenced to six and five years in prison respectively and to pay a 35,000 euros fine to the two Palmarian Catholic bishops they injured. The two, however, were immediately released on probation.

== See also ==
- Conclavism
- Antipope

== Sources ==
- Flores, Alberto (25 April 2016). "El 'papa' de El Palmar de Troya pierde su fe y deja su 'orden' sin despedirse de sus seguidores" [The 'pope' of El Palmar de Troya loses his faith and leaves his 'order' without saying goodbye to his followers]. sevilla.abc.es (in Spanish). Seville, ES: Diario ABC. Archived from the original on 29 May 2016.
- Lundberg, Magnus (1 May 2016) [first posted 2016-04-22]. "The Palmarian Pope has resigned and is succeeded by Peter III". magnuslundberg.net (blog). Uppsala, Sweden: Magnus Lundberg. Archived from the original on 3 May 2016. (Content has been added since the first posted date)
- Macías, Javier (26 April 2016). "Los cuatro 'papas' del Palmar de Troya" [The four 'popes' of Palmar de Troya]. sevilla.abc.es (in Spanish). Seville, ES: Diario ABC. Archived from the original on 29 May 2016.
- Macías, Javier (27 April 2016). "El 'papa' del Palmar niega haber robado el 'papamóvil': 'Es mio, estaba a mi nombre' " [The 'pope' of Palmar denies having stolen the 'popemobile': 'It's mine, it was in my name' ]. sevilla.abc.es (in Spanish). Seville, ES: Diario ABC. Archived from the original on 3 May 2016.
- Mayer, Jean-François (27 April 2016). "Église palmarienne: Grégoire XVIII perd la foi et va se marier, le nouveau pape Pierre III est un Suisse" [Palmarienne Church: Gregory XVIII loses faith and will marry, the new Pope Peter III is Swiss]. orbis.info (blog) (in French). Jean-François Mayer. Archived from the original on 27 April 2016.

Religious titles
Preceded by Pope Peter II	Palmarian Pope; Patriarch of El Palmar de Troya; 2011–2016	Succeeded by Pope Peter III
Catholic Church titles
Preceded by Pope Peter II	Pope of the Catholic Church (claim in rivalry with Vatican); 2011–2016	Succeeded by Pope Peter III
