= Pope Peter III =

Pope Peter III may refer to:

- Peter III of Alexandria (fl. 477–490 AD), 27th Pope of Alexandria & Patriarch of the See of St. Mark
- Peter III of Palmar de Troya (Joseph Odermatt), 4th Palmarian Antipope

== See also ==
- Peter III (disambiguation)
