= María de las Maravillas de Jesús =

Spanish Saint (1891–1974)

Saint María de las Maravillas de Jesús OCD
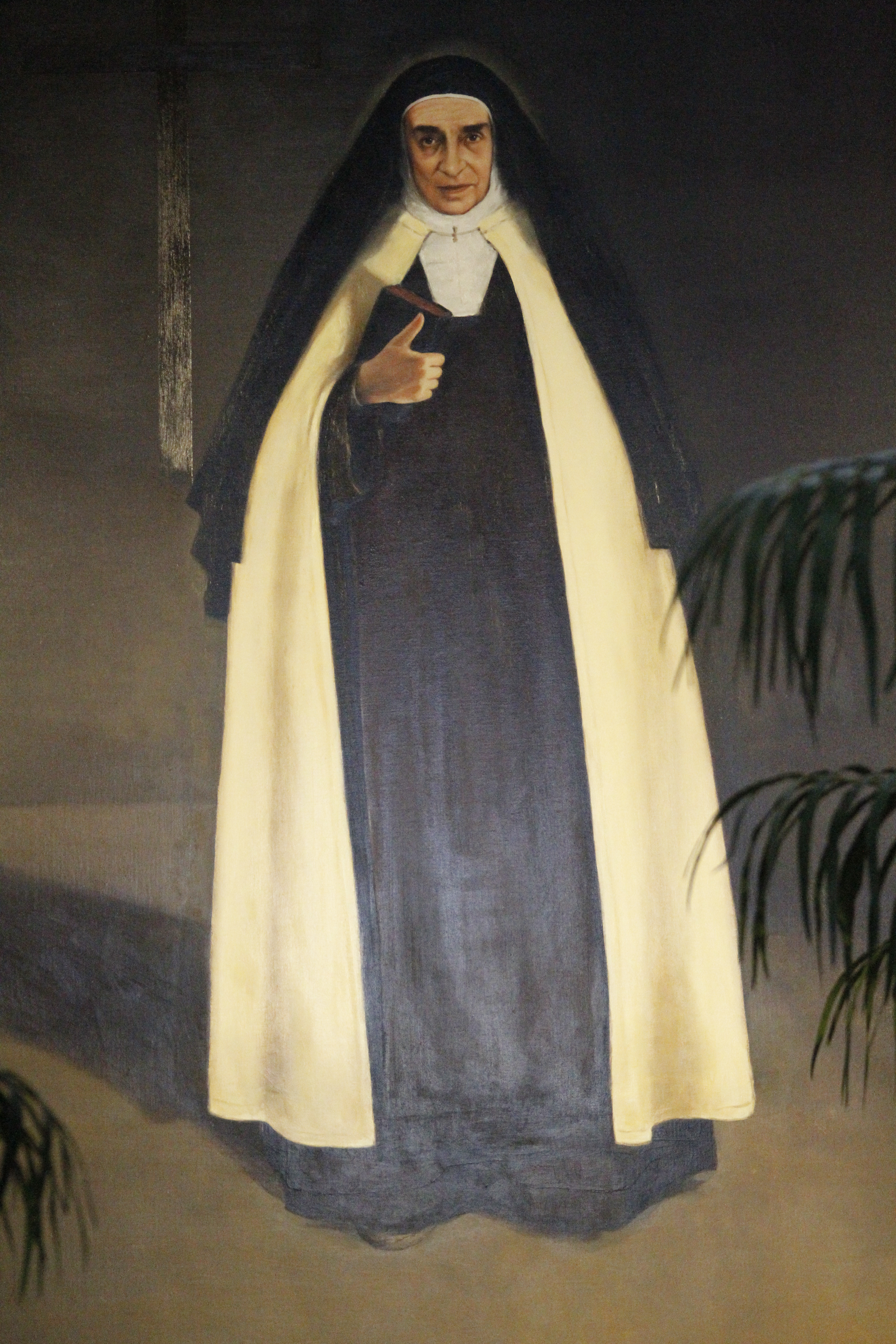
- Painting of the Saint in the Almudena Cathedral

Virgin
- Born: 4 November 1891; Madrid, Kingdom of Spain
- Died: 11 December 1974 (aged 83); La Aldehuela, Madrid, Francoist Spain
- Venerated in: Catholic Church; Palmarian Catholic Church
- Beatified: 10 May 1998, Saint Peter's Square by Pope John Paul II
- Canonized: 4 May 2003, Columbus Plaza, Madrid, Spain by Pope John Paul II
- Feast: 11 December
- Attributes: habit of a Discalced Carmelite, holding the rule of the order

María de las Maravillas de Jesús, OCD (born María de las Maravillas Pidal Chico de Guzmán; 4 November 1891 - 11 December 1974) was a Spanish Discalced Carmelite. She founded several houses of her order and even set one up in India after serving a brief exile with other Carmelites due to the outbreak of the Spanish Civil War. Pope John Paul II canonized her during his apostolic visit in Madrid in 2003.

== Life ==
María de las Maravillas Pidal Chico de Guzman was born as the last of four children in Madrid on 4 November 1891 and was baptized on 12 November in the local parish church of San Sebastian. She was known as "Mavi" as a child. Her father was Luis Pidal i Mon (†1913), the second Marquis of Pidal, and her mother was Cristina Chico de Guzman i Munoz. Her father was the first Minister of Development and was later the national ambassador to the pontifical see. Her maternal grandmother would tell her the lives of the saints and in 1896 she made a private vow to remain chaste in an effort to follow the example of Saint Agnes. Her grandmother died at the beginning of 1914 after her father died in late 1913. In 1903 she took the Jesuit priest Juan Francisco Lopez as her spiritual director and he remained as such until she entered the order.

María received her confirmation in 1896 and later received her first communion in 1902. In autumn 1918, she and her mother went for a walk and María's mother gave her the blessing to become a nun. María entered the Discalced Carmelites in Madrid at El Escorial on 12 October 1919, where she took the religious name María de las Maravillas de Jesús ("Mary of the marvels of Jesus"). She made her first profession on 7 May 1920. In 1923 she decided to found a convent in Getafe at the Cerro de los Ángeles near the monument erected in the geographical center of Spain. The Bishop of Madrid was enthusiastic about the idea and on 19 May 1924 she and three nuns of El Escorial settled for a brief period of time in a house at Getafe while awaiting the building of a convent. On 30 May 1924 she made her solemn profession there at El Escorial and in June 1926 was appointed as the prioress of the convent of El Cerro in Madrid which opened on 31 October 1926. On 15 September 1932 the Bishop of Vijayapuram asked her to found a Carmelite convent and on 11 September 1933 eight nuns went there to establish it. She herself would have gone but her superiors did not allow for her to leave.

The religious persecution that started in 1931 saw her spend countless hours each night in reflection and both requested and obtained permission from Pope Pius XI for them to leave their group in order to give up their lives if the time came to defend the sacred image should it be violated. On 1 May 1936 an armed band tried to attack the convent by scaling the walls and the Communist mayor warned her (she received him in the parlor) that she and the others should flee lest something terrible happen to them. On 22 July 1936 the nuns were expelled from their convent and were welcomed by the Ursulines in Getafe where the Carmelites were monitored under house arrest. She then fled to an apartment on Calle Claudio Coello in Madrid where she spent fourteen months. In September 1937 she was able to leave Madrid with her group and - going through to Lourdes in France (arriving there on 16 September 1937) - later re-entered Spain to settle in Las Batuecas in Salamanca on 28 September 1937 which had been purchased before the war. There - at the request of the Bishop of Coria-Cáceres - she founded a new convent. In March 1939 she returned to the Cerro de los Ángeles to restore the convent there and would go on to found houses at Toledo in 1960 and at Málaga in 1964.

The nun founded several convents which included one at Mancera de Abajo in Salamanca in 1944 and in Duruelo at Ávila in 1947 as well as at Arenas de San Pedro in Avila in 1954 and at San Calixto in the Cordoba mountains in 1956. One was also founded at Aravaca in Madrid in 1958 and at La Aldehuela in Madrid in 1961 where she was elected as the prioress and lived there until her death. She also founded a convent in Kottayam in India in 1933. In 1972 she founded the "Association of Saint Teresa". She was confined to her bed for rest after suffering from a bout of pneumonia on Good Friday in 1967.

Mother Maravillas died on 11 December 1974 at her convent and her remains are interred at La Aldehuela. Her final words were: "What happiness to die a Carmelite!" She had suffered a heart attack on 7 November 1962 and suffered another on 27 October 1972 which left her in a weakened condition until her death and she had received the Anointing of the Sick and her last Communion on 8 December 1974.

== Sainthood ==
The beatification process opened on 19 June 1980 after the Congregation for the Causes of Saints issued the official "nihil obstat" to the cause and titled her as a Servant of God while the cognitional process in Madrid spanned from 1981 until 1983 before the C.C.S. validated this process in Rome on 5 October 1984. The postulation - a decade later in 1994 - then sent the Positio dossier to Rome for assessment. The theologians assessed and approved the cause on 24 May 1996 as did the C.C.S. on 1 October 1996 while this allowed for Pope John Paul II to confirm that she led a life of heroic virtue in a move that saw him name her as Venerable on 17 December 1996.

The process for a miracle needed for her beatification opened in Spain and lasted in the diocese of its origin from 15 February 1984 until its closure on 13 April 1984; the C.C.S. later validated this process on 5 October 1984. The medical board issued their assent to this miracle on 24 April 1997 while theologians also approved it later on 30 September 1997; the C.C.S. did likewise on 16 December 1997. John Paul II approved the healing to be a legitimate miracle on 18 December 1997 and beatified Mother Maravillas on 10 May 1998 in Saint Peter's Square.

The process for the second miracle - the one for full sainthood - opened and closed in Argentina and received validation on 21 January 2000 before receiving the approval of the medical board on 10 May 2001; theologians also approved it on 27 November 2001 as did the C.C.S. on 5 February 2002. John Paul II approved this miracle on 23 April 2002 and canonized Maravillas on his apostolic visit to Spain in Plaza de Colón in Madrid on 4 May 2003.

In the Palmarian Catholic Church, based in El Palmar de Troya, Andalusia, Spain, Mother Maravillas de Jesús is celebrated as a canonised saint, having been canonised by the Palmarian Holy See on 17 September 1978 in the Fourteenth Papal Document of Pope Gregory XVII. Declaring “We had the great fortune to visit her on two occasions. Therefore We have drawn a true portrait of the Saint. On those two occasions, she brought to light with wisdom, the path We were one day to follow. In the second visit, she said with serenity, gravity, and sweetness; "You, one day, will guide the sacred destinies of the Church." We recall perfectly, that on saying these words, she made a deep inclination towards Us, who at the time were not even a cleric. In that moment We received a strong impulse, and, knees to the ground, We piously kissed the feet of that holy Carmelite.”
