= Joseph Odermatt =

Palmarian Catholic Church pope (born 1966)

Antipope Peter III
- Supreme Pontiff of the Palmarian Catholic Church; Patriarch of El Palmar de Troya
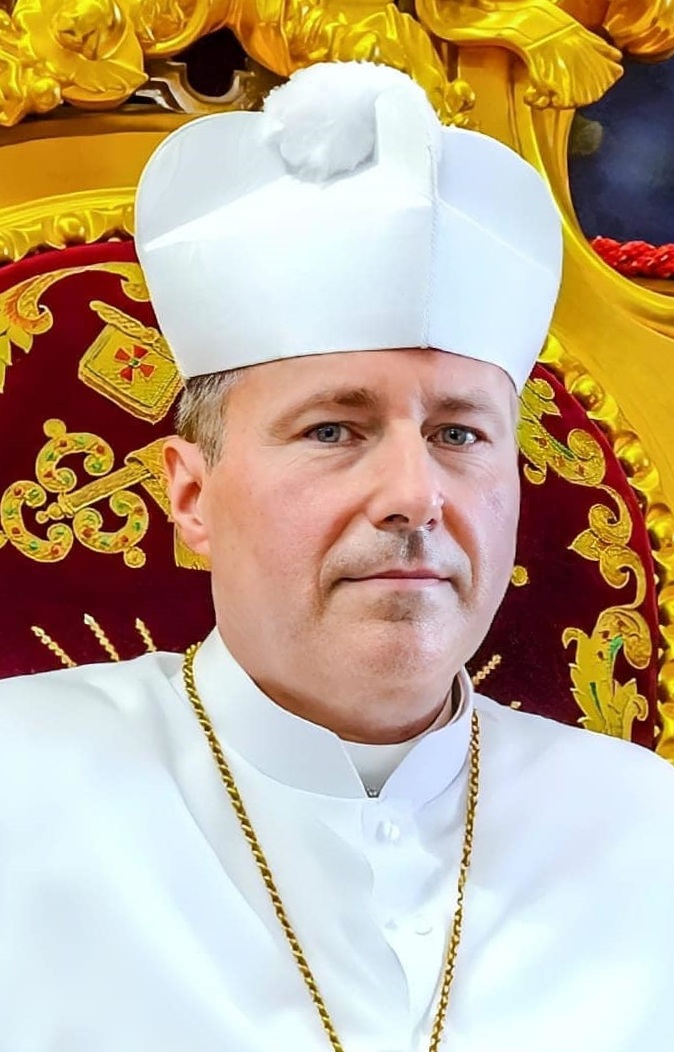
- Official portrait, 2025
- Papacy began: 22 April 2016
- Predecessor: Gregory XVIII
- Opposed to: Francis (2016–2025); Leo XIV (2025–present)

Orders
- Ordination: 2 May 1985
- Consecration: 1991
- Created cardinal: 2005 by Peter II

Personal details
- Born: Markus Josef Odermatt; 13 March 1966 (age 60) Stans, Nidwalden, Switzerland
- Denomination: Palmarian Catholic Church (claims to be the Catholic Church)
- Motto: De Glória Ecclésiæ ("Glory of the Church")

Peter III (born Markus Josef Odermatt; 13 March 1966), also known by the religious name Eliseo María de la Santa Faz, is the fourth pope of the Palmarian Catholic Church who, in this capacity, claims to be the 266th pope of the Catholic Church from 22 April 2016 to the present. (Note: It is difficult to obtain reliable and verified information about the Palmarian sect, according to religious studies scholar Jean-François Mayer, since the sect neither makes public announcements nor had an online presence until 2018. Little is known about what happens inside the sect compound, according to ABC newspaper journalist Alberto Flores, who described the usual behavior of the sect as "habitual secrecy" (habitual ocultismo).) He succeeded Palmarian Pope Gregory XVIII (Ginés Jesús Hernández), to whom he had earlier served as Palmarian Secretary of State, after Hernández left the Palmarian Church and reconciled with the Holy See.

== Life ==
Odermatt was born in Stans, Canton of Nidwalden, in Switzerland. He claims to be a descendant of Saint Nicholas of Flüe. He joined the Order of Carmelites of the Holy Face in 1985 and worked for eighteen years as a missionary in South America. He served as the order's secretary of state from 2011 until 2016. In 2016 he succeeded Ginés Jesús Hernández as pope of the Palmarian Catholic Church, taking the papal name Peter III. He has his episcopal seat at the Cathedral-Basilica of Our Crowned Mother of Palmar.

Some months later he published an encyclical letter, in which he accused his predecessor of discrediting his former church and of stealing two million euros from the Palmarian Catholic Church, alongside several goods (including a BMW X6): he subsequently declared him an apostate, excommunicated him and declared all of his acts to be null and void. Hernández denies the charges of stealing.

Odermatt disbanded the papal guard corps instituted by his predecessor, deeming it unnecessary for his security. In 2018 he travelled to the United States for the first time to participate at a "Eucharistic, Marian and Josephine Congress".

During his office, the Palmarian Catholic Church established an online presence for the first time, opening a website and accounts on Facebook, Instagram, Twitter and Pinterest and a channel on YouTube.

Mainstream Roman Catholics consider Odermatt to be an Antipope and believe that the current head of the Catholic Church is Pope Leo XIV (born Robert Francis Prevost), an American from Chicago. The inverse is believed by Palmarian Catholics: namely that Odermatt ("Pope Peter III") is the true Pope and Prevost ("Antipope Leo XIV") is an Antipope.

== Sources ==
- Flores, Alberto (2016-04-25). "El 'papa' de El Palmar de Troya pierde su fe y deja su 'orden' sin despedirse de sus seguidores" [The 'pope' of El Palmar de Troya loses his faith and leaves his 'order' without saying goodbye to his followers]. sevilla.abc.es (in Spanish). Seville, ES: Diario ABC. Archived from the original on 2016-05-29.
- Macías, Javier (2016-04-26). "Los cuatro 'papas' del Palmar de Troya" [The four 'popes' of Palmar de Troya]. sevilla.abc.es (in Spanish). Seville, ES: Diario ABC. Archived from the original on 2016-05-29.
- Macías, Javier (2016-04-27). "El 'papa' del Palmar niega haber robado el 'papamóvil': 'Es mio, estaba a mi nombre' " [The 'pope' of Palmar denies having stolen the 'popemobile': 'It's mine, it was in my name' ]. sevilla.abc.es (in Spanish). Seville, ES: Diario ABC. Archived from the original on 2016-05-03.
- Mayer, Jean-François (2016-04-27). "Église palmarienne: Grégoire XVIII perd la foi et va se marier, le nouveau pape Pierre III est un Suisse" [Palmarienne Church: Gregory XVIII loses faith and will marry, the new Pope Peter III is Swiss]. orbis.info (blog) (in French). Jean-François Mayer. Archived from the original on 2016-04-27.

Religious titles
Preceded by Pope Gregory XVIII	Palmarian Pope; Patriarch of El Palmar de Troya; 2016–present	Succeeded by incumbent
Catholic Church titles
Preceded by Pope Gregory XVIII	Pope of the Catholic Church (claim in rivalry with Vatican); 2016–present	Succeeded by incumbent
