= Peter III =

Peter III may refer to:

== Politics ==
- Peter III of Bulgaria (ruled in 1072)
- Peter III of Aragon (1239–1285)
- Peter III of Arborea (died 1347)
- Peter III Aaron (died 1467)
- Pedro III of Kongo (ruler in 1669)
- Peter III of Russia (1728–1762)
- Peter III of Portugal (1717–1786)
- Peter III (cat) (1947-1964)

== Religion ==
- Pope Peter III of Alexandria (477–489)
- Peter III of Raqqa, Syriac Orthodox Patriarch of Antioch in 581–591
- Peter III of Antioch Greek Orthodox Patriarch of Antioch
- Peter III (bishop of Lugo) (r. from 1113 until 1133)
- Peter III, Pope Peter III of the schismatic Palmarian Catholic Church

== See also ==
- Pedro III (disambiguation)
