= Clemente Domínguez y Gómez =

Palmarian Catholic Church pope (1946–2005)

Palmarian Pope Gregory XVII The Very Great
- Supreme Pontiff of the Palmarian Catholic Church; Patriarch of El Palmar de Troya
- Installed: 6 August 1978
- Term ended: 21 March 2005
- Predecessor: Paul VI (claimed)
- Successor: Peter II
- Opposed to: John Paul I (1978); John Paul II (1978–2005)

Orders
- Ordination: 1 January 1976 by Ngô Đình Thục
- Consecration: 11 January 1976 by Ngô Đình Thục

Personal details
- Born: Clemente Domínguez y Gómez; 23 May 1946 Seville, Andalusia, Spain
- Died: 21 March 2005 (aged 58) El Palmar de Troya, Andalusia, Spain
- Buried: Cathedral-Basilica of Our Crowned Mother of Palmar, El Palmar de Troya, Andalusia, Spain
- Denomination: Palmarian Catholic Church (claims to be Catholic Church)
- Motto: De Glória Olívæ (Glory of the Olive)

Ordination history
History
Priestly ordination
- Ordained by: Ngô Đình Thục
Episcopal consecration
- Consecrated by: Ngô Đình Thục
- Date: 11 January 1976
Episcopal succession
Bishops consecrated by Clemente Domínguez y Gómez as principal consecrator
- Alfred Seiwert-Fleige: 1 November 1978

Gregory XVII (Latin: Gregorius PP. XVII; Spanish: Gregorio XVII; born Clemente Domínguez y Gómez; 23 May 1946 – 21 March 2005), also known by the religious name Fernando María de la Santa Faz, was the first Pope of the Palmarian Catholic Church, who in this capacity, claimed to be the 263rd Pope of the Catholic Church from 6 August 1978 until his death on 21 March 2005. He was an alleged visionary, seer and mystic, who, following claimed apparitions of the Blessed Virgin Mary as Our Crowned Mother of Palmar, founded a religious order which claimed to continue the work of the Carmelites, known as the Carmelites of the Holy Face; after 1978, this order became synonymous with the Palmarian Church.

Domínguez and several other members of the Carmelites of the Holy Face, was ordained as a priest and then consecrated as a Bishop in January 1976, by the schismatic Archbishop Ngô Đình Thục, a Vietnamese cleric of the Roman Catholic Church. This Archbishop according to Rome returned to union with the post-conciliar Church in his later years. Following the death of Pope Paul VI in August 1978, Clemente claimed to have a vision where he was allegedly mystically crowned Pope of the Palmarian Christian Church by Jesus Christ himself. He claimed that the Holy See of the Catholic Church had been moved from Rome to El Palmar de Troya, due to the supposed apostasy of the former. During his pontificate, he issued many documents between 1978 and 1980, which laid out the direction of the Church; he invalidated the Second Vatican Council and is also claimed to have excommunicated the leaders of the Vatican City, declaring them Antipopes.

In close collaboration with his trusted éminence grise and Palmarian Secretary of State, Fr. Isidore (Manuel Alonso Corral), during his tenure as Palmarian Pontiff there took place two ecumenical councils; the First Palmarian Council (1980–1992) and the Second Palmarian Council (1995–2002). The result of the latter Council was a claimed divinely-mandated purification of the text of the Vulgate (the Bible preferred for many centuries by the Catholic Church), in the form of The Sacred History or Holy Palmarian Bible. His reign also oversaw the construction of the large Cathedral-Basilica of Our Crowned Mother of Palmar at El Palmar de Troya, just outside Seville in Andalusia, Spain. Following his death in 2005, the day after, Antipope Peter II (Manuel Alonso Corral), his successor, canonised him as a Catholic saint in the Palmarian Catholic Church as "Pope St. Gregory XVII the Very Great".

== Biography ==
=== Background ===
Clemente Domínguez y Gómez was born in Écija, province of Seville, Andalusia, on 23 April 1946, to Rafael Domínguez and Lucía Maria Gómez, Spanish Catholic parents and was raised with a traditional Catholic education. As a young man he worked several different jobs, including for the Compañía Sevillana de Electricidad, an electricity company in Seville and gained the nicknamed "la Voltio", before eventually becoming an accountant working in an insurance company. As a youth Clemente lived a somewhat libertine lifestyle, as a Palmarian source describes during his youth he had a "certain attachment to the world and its vanities, but with the most tender filial love towards the Virgin Mary."

=== Our Lady of Palmar ===
At 23 years old, he became closely associated with the Palmar de Troya movement, which had its origins in an alleged apparition of the Blessed Virgin Mary, under the title of Our Lady of Palmar, on 30 March 1968, in El Palmar de Troya, a village near Utrera in the Province of Seville. He claimed to have experienced visions of the Virgin Mary beginning on 30 September 1969. He claimed that the alleged Virgin condemned heresy and progressivism, namely the reform of the Roman Catholic Church as a result of Vatican II. His followers claimed he allegedly possessed the stigmata on his hands. The Roman Catholic Church has cast doubt on the legitimacy of the alleged visions and apparitions.

=== Ordination by Catholic Archbishop Thục ===
In December 1975, Clemente Domínguez founded his own religious order, The Carmelites of the Holy Face, allegedly upon instructions from the Blessed Virgin Mary in an apparition.

Domínguez, who assumed the name Father Ferdinand,, was consecrated a bishop by Roman Catholic Archbishop Pierre Martin Ngô Đình Thục in January 1976. Archbishop Thục was subsequently excommunicated for his consecrations, which were deemed valid but illicit. Domínguez was also excommunicated latae sentientiae. Thục, the Archbishop who consecrated Gómez, reconciled with Rome before his death in 1984.

=== Claim to the Papacy ===
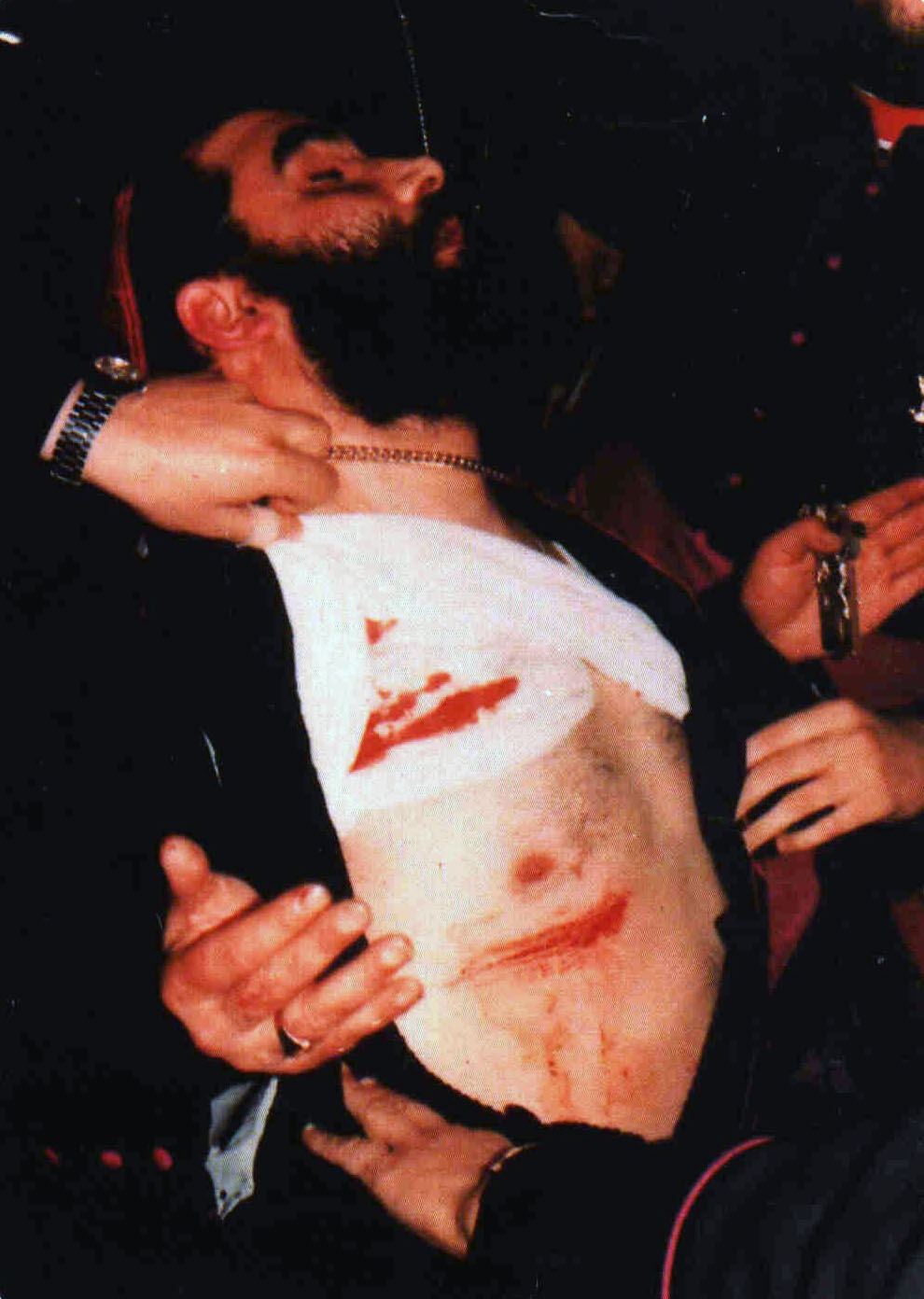
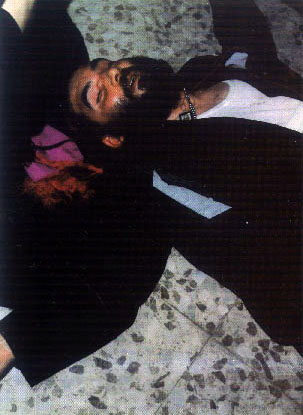
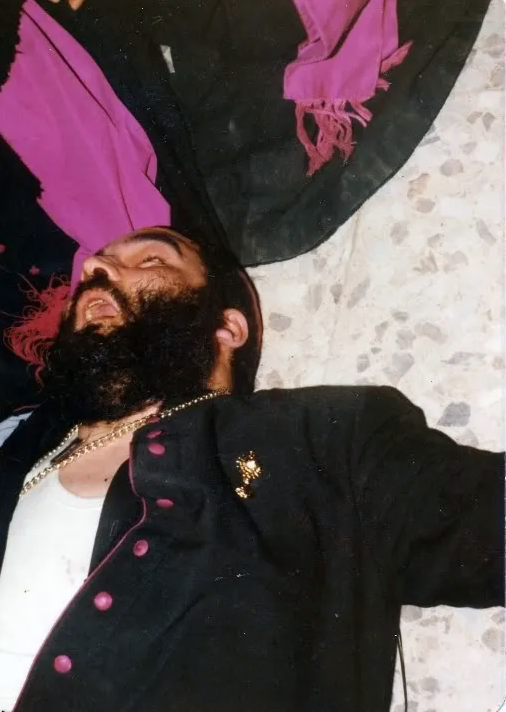
The blind-seer, Clemente Domínguez y Gómez (later Pope Gregory XVII), during a mystical ecstasy, showing visible wounds of the stigmata from the Crown of Thorns and Spear of Longinus.

In May 1976, Domínguez lost his eyeballs in a car accident. He claimed further visions, including visions from Jesus, who purportedly told him: "You shall be the Peter to come, the pope who will consolidate the Faith and the Church in her integrity, who shall battle against heresy with great power, for legions of angels shall assist you...Great Pope Gregory, Glory of the Olives..." He also claimed that Christ had named him his sub-vicar, with the automatic right of succession to the papacy after Pope Paul VI. On August 6, 1978, Pope Paul died, and Domínguez claimed the papacy, proclaiming himself Pope Gregory XVII.

Domínguez claimed that he was visited by Christ, along with Saint Peter and Saint Paul, who told him:

The reign of the Glory of the Olives has begun...a great day today, in which you are vested with the office of Pope, on this feast of the Transfiguration on Mount Tabor—Feastday of the Holy Face, of the Order of which you are the Founder and Father General. The great Pontificate of the Glory of the Olives begins: The Pope foretold by many mystics and in many prophecies; the Pope who unites in his veins the blood of Spain, the noble blood of Spain, with the true blood of France and with the blood of the chosen people, the Jewish people. There, the grandeur! He will not delay long before taking up the sword and fulfilling the mission of emperor and great monarch...It was also foretold in prophecies in past times how this pope would be elected: namely through the direct intervention of the Apostles Saint Peter and Saint Paul. There is no other way of opposing the official election in conclave in Rome from which the antipope will come...Only the simple and humble of heart will recognize the true Pope: Pope Gregory XVII.

On 15 August 1978, Pope Gregory XVII was crowned pope by four of his newly created college of cardinals in a coronation held in Seville, Spain. During his papacy, he purported to canonize General Francisco Franco and Christopher Columbus. According to his supporters, Pope Gregory XVII was destined to be the last pope and would be crucified and die in Jerusalem.

=== Sexual scandal ===
In the 1990s, Pope Gregory XVII rumours began to spread in the Church, claiming that the Pope had been guilty of sins against chastity, with various priests and nuns. After years of silence, in 1997 he admitted to this.

== Death ==
He died on 21 March 2005, in El Palmar de Troya and was succeeded by Manuel Corral, who took the name Pope Peter II. Incidentally, the papacy of Gregory XVII closely overlapped that of Pope John Paul II. He died, aged only 58, a mere 11 days prior to the death of his Roman Catholic "rival," Pope John Paul II aged 84.

== Legacy ==
Domínguez was allegedly canonized as a saint by Corral on 24 March 2005, two days after his death. He has subsequently been referred to by adherents of the Palmarian Church as "Pope Saint Gregory XVII the Very Great". On 29 July 2005, Corral declared that Domínguez's soul did not spend time in purgatory, but ascended directly to heaven. The Palmarian Catholic Church considers Pope Gregory XVII to have been "vilely caluminated and gravely betrayed", describing him as a "Exceptionally Radiant Solar Luminary of the Church." In the Palmarian “History of the Popes,” or formally, the "Historical Review of All the Popes Who Have Shepherded the Holy Church Founded by Our Lord Jesus Christ", a document which was initially published as part of the Palmarian Bible in 2001, but is now published as an independent edition, he is described in extremely laudatory terms;

The Sacred Person of this Pope is the Second Stone or Rock of the Church directly chosen and put in place by Our Lord Jesus Christ. This Glorious Pope carried out his entire Pontificate deprived of bodily sight, having lost both his eyes in a car accident. This Blessed Vicar of Christ wielded the flaming sword of Elias, cutting away any error or corruption in the true Church of Christ whether coming from outside or originating within. This Holy Supreme Pontiff, as Good Shepherd and Zealous Guardian of the House of the Lord, watched at the door of the sheepfold confined to him by Christ, preventing the entry of fierce wolves to disperse and devour the flock; and in turn expelled those who, camouflaged, attempted to corrupt the Church from within. This Holy Pope and Great Caudillo of the Tajo, with supreme courage, anathematized the antipope of Rome John Paul I the freemason, and the antipope of Rome John Paul II the freemason; and with the canons of his Infallible Doctrine and inflexible Discipline, proclaimed the Great Crusade of the Apocalyptic Period by means of an edict, doctrinal and disciplinary, yet belligerent, in defence of the rights of God and Church, openly combatting all heresy and other corruption.

— Palmarian Holy See, Historical Review of All the Popes, 2013.

== Papal documents ==
- First Document (Tridentine Mass & Reception of Eucharist)
- Second Document (Marian Dogmas)
- Third Document (Josephine Dogmas)
- Fourth Document (Concelebrations, Cassock, Latin, Heresies, Consecration of Immaculate Heart)
- Fifth Document (Priesthood, Celibacy, Worker Priests)
- Sixth Document (Marriage, Birth Control, Baptism, Education of Children)
- Seventh Document (Catechesis, Creed, Confession or Penance, Norms for Guidance)
- Eighth Document (Spiritual Life of Christian)
- Ninth Document (Break with Rome)
- Tenth Document (Canonisation of Padre Pio)
- Eleventh Document (Decree on Sacred Place of Heroldsbach, Germany)

== In film ==
In the 1986 Spanish comedy film Manuel y Clemente, Clemente is played by Ángel de Andrés López.

== See also ==
- Conclavism
- Sedevacantism
- Jean-Gaston Tremblay, a traditionalist Catholic from Canada who also proclaimed himself "Pope Gregory XVII"
- Siri thesis, the claim that Giuseppe Cardinal Siri was elected pope in 1958, with the name Gregory XVII

Religious titles
| Preceded by Position created | Palmarian Pope; Patriarch of El Palmar de Troya; 1978–2005 | Succeeded by Pope Peter II |
Catholic Church titles
| Preceded by Pope Paul VI (Palmarians claim Pope Paul VI was the last Roman Pope) | Pope of the Catholic Church (claim in rivalry with Vatican); 1978–2005 | Succeeded by Pope Peter II |
