= Pedro III =

Pedro III may refer to:

- Pedro III of Aragon (1239–1285)
- Pedro III of Kongo (fl. 1669–1680)
- Pedro III of Portugal (1717–1786)

== See also ==
- Peter III (disambiguation)
