= Manuel Alonso Corral =

Palmarian Catholic Church pope (1934–2011)

Antipope Peter II The Great
- Supreme Pontiff of the Palmarian Catholic Church; Patriarch of El Palmar de Troya
- Papacy began: 21 March 2005
- Papacy ended: 15 July 2011
- Predecessor: Gregory XVII
- Successor: Gregory XVIII
- Opposed to: John Paul II (2005); Benedict XVI (2005–2011)

Orders
- Ordination: 1 January 1976 by Ngô Đình Thục
- Consecration: 11 January 1976 by Ngô Đình Thục

Personal details
- Born: Manuel Alonso Corral; 22 November 1934 Cabeza del Buey, Badajoz, Spain
- Died: 15 July 2011 (aged 76) El Palmar de Troya, Seville, Spain
- Buried: Cathedral-Basilica of Our Crowned Mother of Palmar, El Palmar de Troya, Andalusia, Spain
- Denomination: Palmarian Catholic Church
- Motto: De Cruce Apocalýptica ("Of the Apocalyptic Cross")

Ordination history
History
Episcopal consecration
- Consecrated by: Ngô Đình Thục
- Date: 11 January 1976

Saint
- Venerated in: Palmarian Catholic Church
- Canonized: 17 July 2011, Cathedral-Basilica of Our Crowned Mother of Palmar, El Palmar de Troya, Spain by Gregory XVIII

Peter II (Latin: Petrus PP. II; Spanish: Pedro II; born Manuel Alonso Corral; 22 November 1934 – 15 July 2011), also known by the religious name Isidoro María de la Santa Faz, was the second Pope of the Palmarian Catholic Church, who in this capacity, claimed to be the 264th Pope of the Catholic Church from 21 March 2005 until his death on 15 July 2011. He served for many years as the Palmarian Secretary of State to Pope Gregory XVII (Clemente Domínguez y Gómez) and wrote down many of the visions of the blind Pope. He played a prominent intellectual role in formulating the works of the First Palmarian Council (1980–1992) and the Second Palmarian Council (1995–2002).

== Biography ==
Corral was a lawyer, but he left his legal practice to join Clemente Domínguez y Gómez, who founded the Carmelite Order of the Holy Face in 1975.

Corral was ordained priest and bishop by Catholic Archbishop Pierre Martin Ngô Đình Thục in 1976 along with Domínguez and three others (these three others had already been Catholic priests for many years). Archbishop Thuc and the five new bishops were excommunicated by Pope Paul VI for consecrating bishops without the Holy See's approval. Thuc recanted and repudiated his consecrations for the Palmar-based Carmelite Order of the Holy Face. He asked Pope Paul VI to be forgiven and was absolved of all ecclesial penalties in 1976, until 1981 when he was again excommunicated by Pope John Paul II for illicit consecrations.

In 1978, Domínguez claimed that Jesus Christ created him pope in 1978 in a mystical vision and transformed the Order into the Palmarian Catholic Church. Domínguez, now called Pope Gregory XVII, named Corral Cardinal Secretary of State of their church and named him his successor in 2000. This appointment – instead of leaving this decision to a Palmarian College of Cardinals – contributed to a rift in the church.

Upon Domínguez's death in 2005, Corral succeeded him as Pope Peter II and headed the Palmarian Christian Church until his own death in 2011. After his death, Corral was canonised on 17 July 2011 by his successor, Gregory XVIII, and has subsequently been referred to by adherents of his church as "Pope Saint Peter II the Great".

== Film ==
In the 1986 Spanish film Manuel y Clemente, Manuel is played by Juan Jesús Valverde.

Religious titles
Preceded by Pope Gregory XVII	Palmarian Pope; Patriarch of El Palmar de Troya; 2005–2011	Succeeded by Pope Gregory XVIII
Catholic Church titles
Preceded by Pope Gregory XVII	Pope of the Catholic Church (claim in rivalry with Vatican); 2005–2011	Succeeded by Pope Gregory XVIII
