= Our Lady of Palmar =

Title of the Virgin Mary related to her alleged apparitions at El Palmar de Troya

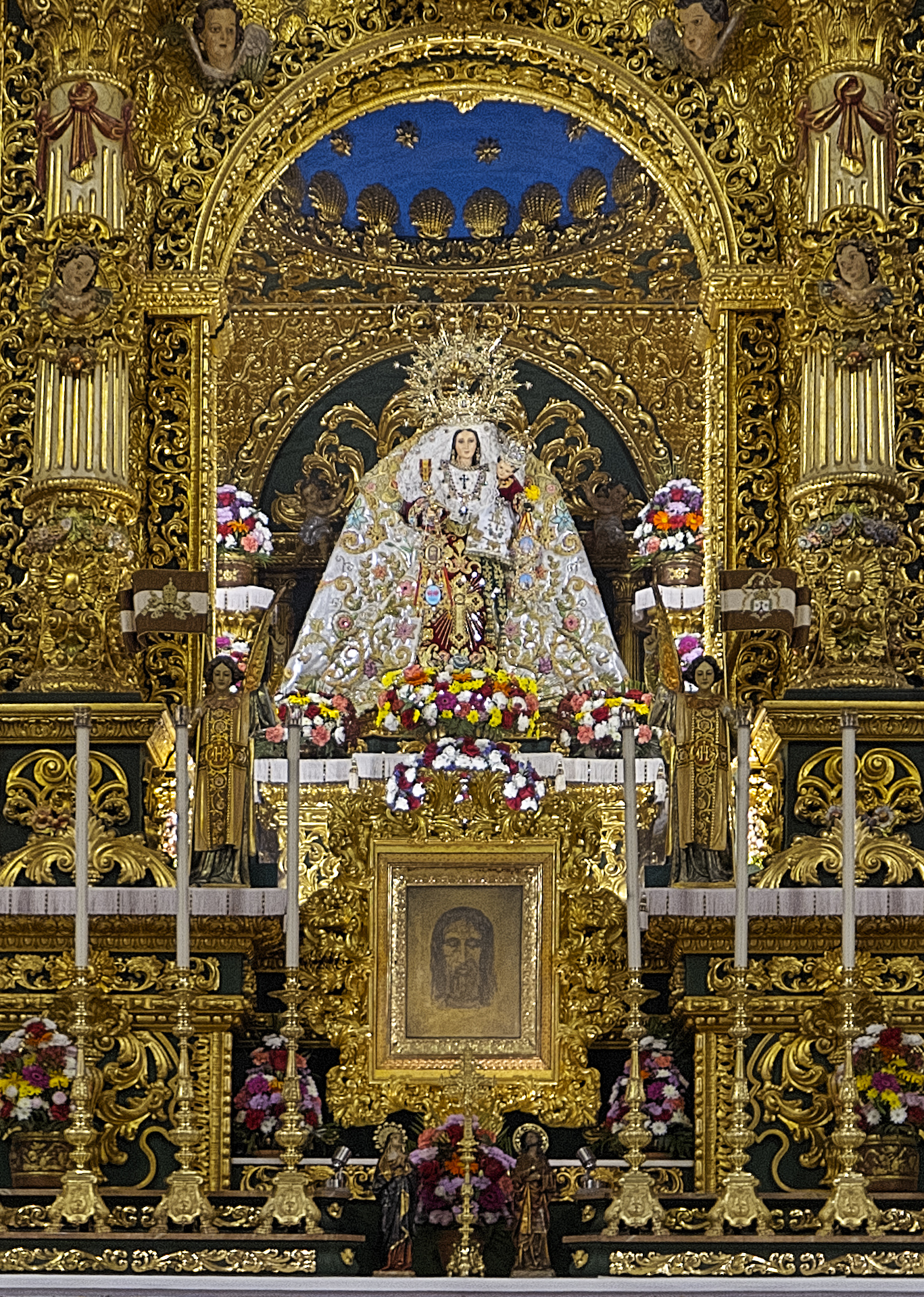
- Statue of Our Lady of Palmar
- Location: El Palmar de Troya, Province of Seville, Andalusia, Spain
- Date: 30 March 1968
- Witness: Ana García, Rafaela Gordo, Josefa Guzmán and Ana Aguilera
- Type: Marian apparition
- Approval: Strongly condemned by the Catholic Church on 18 May 1970; Accepted by Palmarian Catholic Church
- Venerated in: Palmarian Christian Church
- Shrine: Cathedral-Basilica of Our Crowned Mother of Palmar

Our Lady of Palmar (Spanish: Nuestra Señora del Palmar), known formally as Our Crowned Mother of Palmar (Spanish: Nuestra Madre del Palmar Coronada), is a Palmarian Christian title of the Blessed Virgin Mary associated with an alleged Marian apparition in the Spanish village of El Palmar de Troya in 1968. The apparition is strongly condemned by the authorities of the Catholic Church but is recognized by the Palmarian Christian Church. The Cathedral-Basilica of Our Crowned Mother of Palmar, the mother church of the Palmarian Christian Church, serves as the major shrine of Our Lady of Palmar and was built on the site of the alleged apparition.

== Marian apparition ==
On 30 March 1968 four school girls from El Palmar de Troya – Ana García, Rafaela Gordo, Josefa Guzmán and Ana Aguilera – reported having seen the apparition of "a very beautiful lady" on a bush (lentisco) near the Alcaparrosa field, just outside of the town in Spanish Andalusia, while they were picking flowers. The girls were between 12 and 13 years old.

In the following year, several other people reported apparitions and visions of the Virgin Mary in the field. The alleged apparitions attracted large groups of Catholics to the region from other parts of Spain and abroad. Visionaries reported messages from the Virgin Mary, claiming she instructed people to pray the Our Father and the rosary, and for Catholics to return to worship in the Traditional form.

On 15 October 1968 Clemente Domínguez y Gómez (a collector at the Compañía Sevillana de Electricidad) and Manuel Corral (a lawyer) visited the apparition site for the first time. They became regular visitors, prying on the pilgrims and the so-called "seers" who displayed ecstatic or in trance-like states. On 30 September 1969, Domínguez y Gómez claimed to have a vision of Jesus Christ and Padre Pio, a saint and well-known stigmatist. Later that year, on the 8th and 15th of December, he claimed to have visions of the Blessed Virgin Mary. He also claimed to experience stigmata and other Holy Wounds. According to Domínguez y Gómez, the Virgin Mary and Jesus Christ both communicated to him that the Tridentine Mass was the only correct form of Mass and that the New Order of Mass was blasphemy. There were also warnings that Freemasons and Communists were infiltrating the Catholic Church. Domínguez y Gómez went on to claim that Pope Paul VI was innocent, and that he was a victim of supposed "Masonic infiltrators" in the Roman Curia, who were holding him hostage in the Vatican.

On 18 May 1970 Cardinal José Bueno y Monreal, the Archbishop of Seville formally denounced the apparitions as "collective and superstitious hysteria". The apparition site continued to attract Catholic pilgrims and so, on 18 March 1972, Cardinal Bueno y Monreal reiterated his denunciation of the apparition and visions, forbidding Catholic devotion to Our Lady of Palmar. Under his ruling, no Catholic priests were allowed to make pilgrimages to El Palmar de Troya, and no acts of public worship or religious services were allowed to take place.

On 30 November 1975 Domínguez y Gómez claimed to have a vision of the Virgin Mary and Christ announcing the foundation of a new religious order to reform the Church. In 1975 they founded a canonically irregular religious order, the Order of the Carmelites of the Holy Face in Company with Jesus and Mary. The order was denounced by the local ordinary, the Archbishop of Seville, who refused to ordain any priests or consecrate any religious sisters and brothers to the order. Archbishop Ngô Đình Thục, a Vietnamese clergyman of the Catholic Church, ordained Domínguez y Gómez, Alonso, and two other men to the priesthood, and consecrated Domínguez y Gómez and others as bishops, granting the order apostolic succession. The papal nuncio to Spain, Luigi Dadaglio, declared Archbishop Thục, Domínguez y Gómez, and all Palmaranian bishops excommunicated from the Catholic Church.

In September 1976, the Sacred Congregation for the Doctrine of the Faith in Rome declared all clergy of the order suspended ipso iure.

In 1976, Domínguez y Gómez claimed to have received a private apparition from the Virgin Mary, asking him to consecrate more bishops to the religious order. He also claimed to have been given messages from the Virgin Mary that Pope Paul VI would be succeeded by a valid pope and by an antipope, and that the Catholic Church would no longer be centered in Rome. After the death of Pope Paul VI on 6 August 1978, Domínguez y Gómez claimed to have been crowned by Jesus Christ as the new Pope of the Catholic Church, taking the papal name Pope Gregory XVII and declaring that the Holy See had been transferred from Rome to El Palmar de Troya. At this time the Order of the Carmelites of the Holy Face became synonymous with the Palmarian Catholic Church, which claimed to be the legitimate continuation of the Catholic Church following the supposed "Roman apostasy." Domínguez y Gómez claimed to continue to have visions and witness apparitions of the Virgin Mary until 2000.

== Marian shrine ==
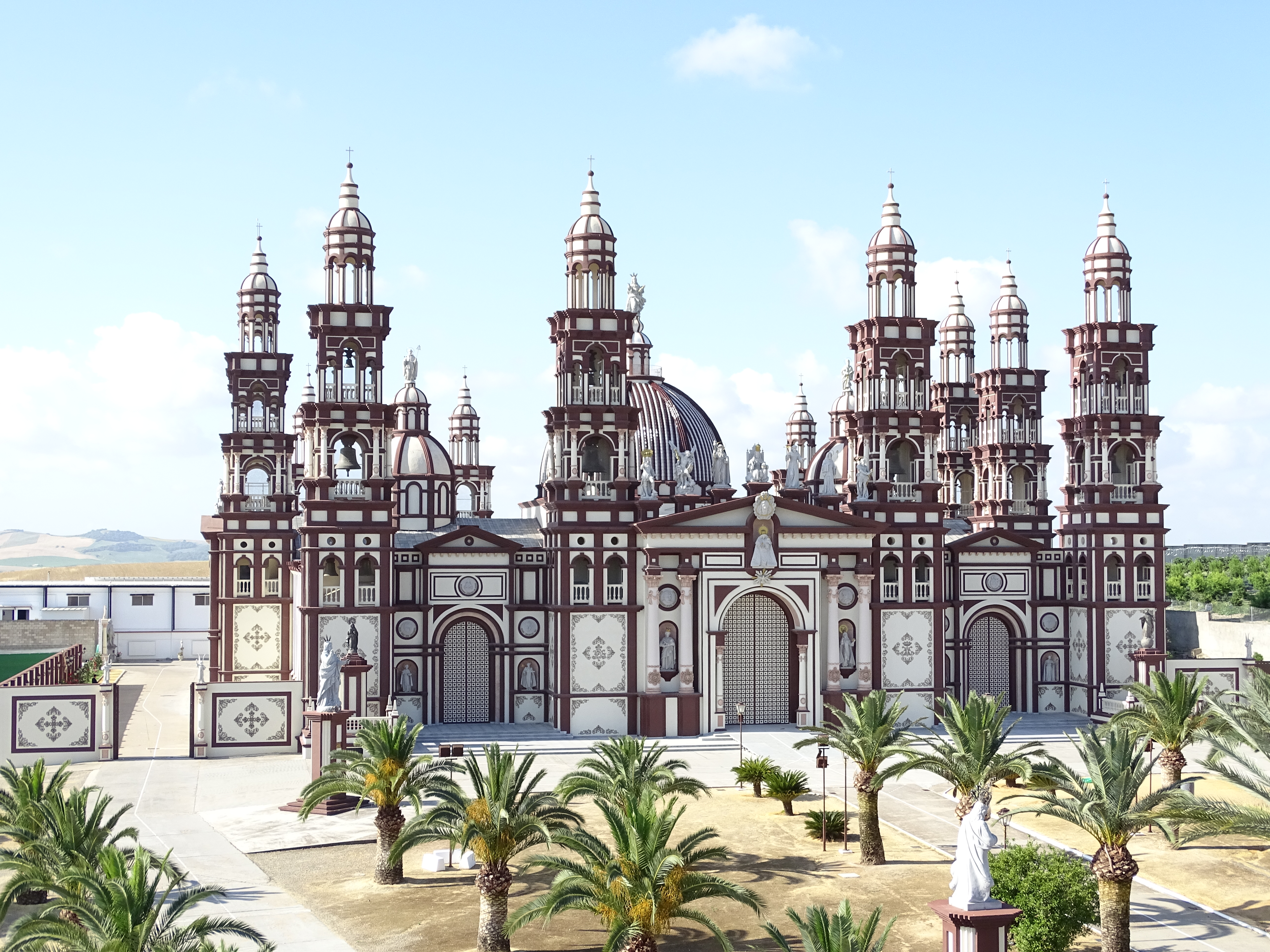
The Cathedral-Basilica of Our Crowned Mother of Palmar

In 1974 Domínguez y Gómez and Corral purchased the Alcaparrosa field and built an elaborate shrine dedicated to the Virgin Mary, surrounded by a wall. In 1978 construction began to build a larger church on the site. The shrine, known as the Cathedral-Basilica of Our Crowned Mother of Palmar, was finished in 2014 and is used as the cathedral and headquarters of the Palmarian Christian Church.
