= Cathedral-Basilica of Our Crowned Mother of Palmar =

Church of the Palmarian Catholic Church

Basilica of La Palmar de Troya
- Cathedral-Basilica of Our Crowned Mother of Palmar
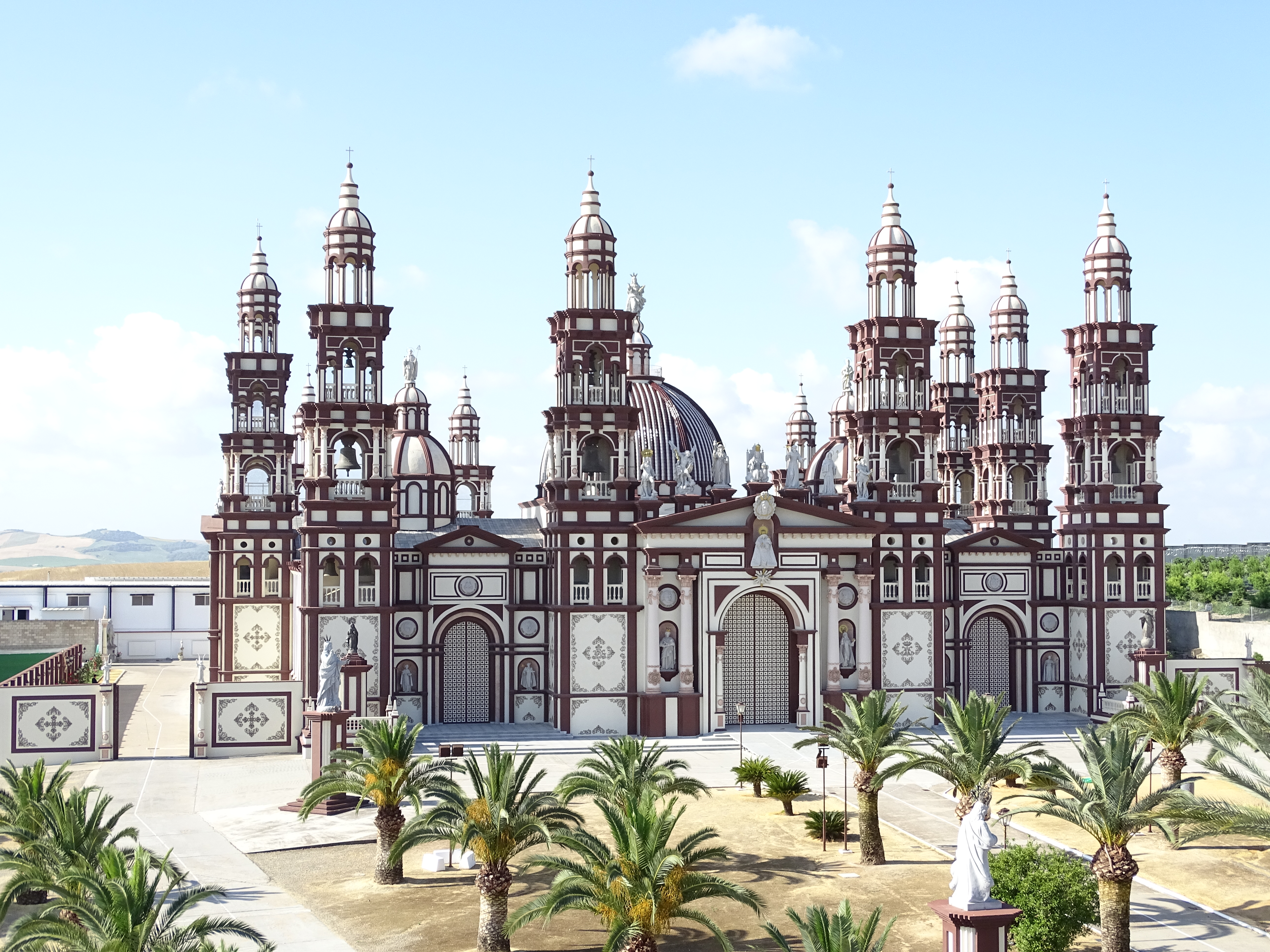
- The cathedral in 2016
- Basilica of La Palmar de Troya
- 37.0561°N 5.8089°W
- Location: El Palmar de Troya
- Country: Spain
- Denomination: Palmarian Catholic Church

History
- Status: Cathedral

Architecture
- Functional status: Active
- Groundbreaking: 1978
- Completed: 2014

The Cathedral-Basilica of Our Crowned Mother of Palmar (Spanish: Catedral-Basílica de Nuestra Madre del Palmar Coronada) is a basilica church in El Palmar de Troya, Spain. The church, dedicated to the Virgin Mary under the title of Our Lady of Palmar, serves as the only cathedral and 'mother church' for the Palmarian Catholic Church, a schismatic independent Catholic denomination not in communion with Rome.

== History ==
The cathedral sits on the location of reported apparitions of Our Lady of Palmar. Construction on the church began in 1978 and was finished in 2014. The church was built as a "Spanish Vatican" for the Pope of the Palmarian Christian Church, a Traditionalist Catholic church which broke away from the Catholic Church in the 1970s.

Inside the cathedral there are fifteen chapels dedicated to the Holy Family, the Holy Trinity, Saint Francis of Assisi, the Souls in Purgatory, Our Lady of Perpetual Help, Ignatius of Loyola, Christ the King, the Blessed Sacrament, the Queen of Heaven, Saint Dominic, Thérèse of Lisieux, the Nativity of Mary, Saint Joseph, Elijah and Padre Pio.

In July 2016 a fire broke out on the church grounds.

On 10 June 2018, former antipope Ginés Jesús Hernández and his wife climbed over the high walls of the cathedral. They were masked and armed, apparently planning to rob the cathedral, but were discovered by a Palmarian bishop who was outside the basilica. According to testimonies, they beat the bishop with a hammer and threatened him and another bishop with a knife. However, in the subsequent fight, Hernández was severely injured while the others escaped with less serious physical injuries.

Hearing the noise outside the cathedral, other church members came to the assistance and they called the police and an ambulance. Hernández was transported by helicopter to the Virgen del Rocio University Hospital in Seville. After recovering, he and his wife were arrested by the Civil Guard. Both were subsequently charged with the accusations of armed robbery, grave assault and assault.

On 17 May 2019, Hernández and his wife were found guilty of all charges and sentenced to six and five years in prison respectively and to pay a 35,000 euros fine to the two Palmarian Catholic bishops they injured. The two, however, were immediately released on probation.

== Gallery ==
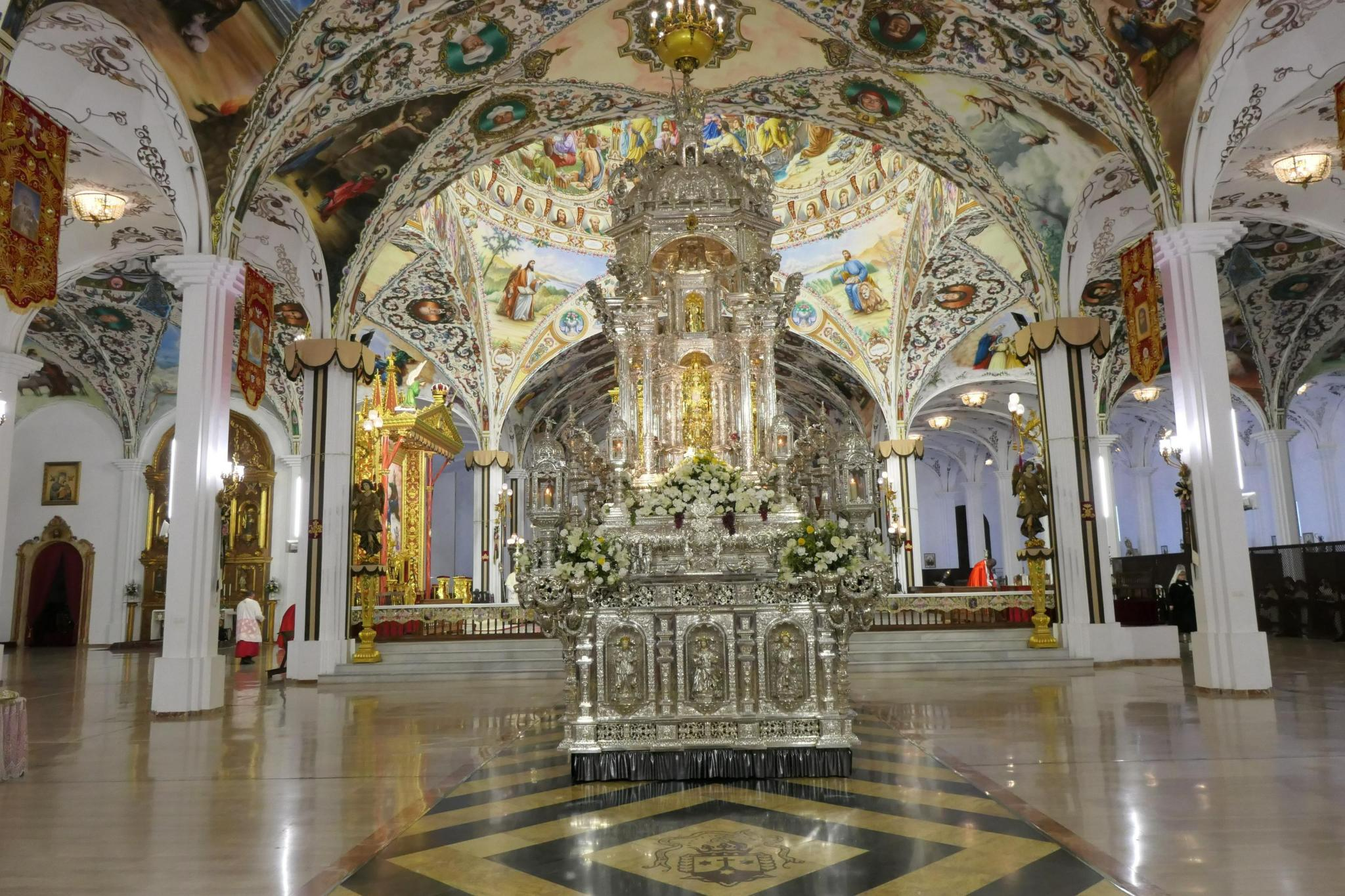
Interior of the Cathedral of El Palmar de Troya. This cathedral is the see of the Palmarian Catholic Church.
