= Pope (title) =

Title used for the Bishops of Alexandria and Rome

Pope is a religious title traditionally accorded to the Coptic and the Greek Orthodox bishops of Alexandria, and then the Bishop of Rome. It has also been used in reference to the Catholicos of All Armenians. Popes may also claim the title patriarch. Both terms come from the Greek πάππας (English: father).

== Etymology ==
The word pope is derived ultimately from the Greek πάππας (páppas) originally an affectionate term meaning "father", later referring to a bishop or patriarch. The earliest record of the use of this title is in regard to the patriarch of Alexandria, Pope Heraclas of Alexandria (232–248) in a letter written by his successor, Pope Dionysius of Alexandria, to Philemon, a Roman presbyter:

τοῦτον ἐγὼ τὸν κανόνα καὶ τὸν τύπον παρὰ τοῦ μακαρίου πάπα ἡμῶν Ἡρακλᾶ παρέλαβον.

Which translates into:

I received this rule and ordinance from our blessed father/pope, Heraclas.

From the early 3rd century, the title was applied generically to all bishops. The earliest extant record of the word papa being used in reference to a Bishop of Rome dates to late 3rd century, when it was allegedly applied to the highly controversial Pope Marcellinus, records surrounding being problematic (since 1969 his feast day is left to local calendars and is no longer inscribed in the General Roman calendar.

According to the Oxford English Dictionary, the earliest recorded use of the title "pope" in English is in an Old English translation (c. 950) of Bede's Ecclesiastical History of the English People:

Þa wæs in þa tid Uitalius papa þæs apostolican seðles aldorbiscop.

In Modern English:

At that time, Pope Vitalian was chief bishop of the apostolic see.

== Later history and contemporary use ==
The title pope continues to be used by Alexandrian bishops: both the Coptic Orthodox and Greek Orthodox patriarchs of Alexandria are known as the "Pope and Patriarch of Alexandria".

In the Western Christian world "pope" is chiefly associated with the Bishops of Rome—and from the 5th or 6th century it became, in the West, a title reserved exclusively for these bishops. Despite its earlier use to refer to any bishop, in 998 an archbishop of Milan was rebuked for having called himself "pope", and in 1073 it was formally decided by Pope Gregory VII that no other bishop of the Catholic Church would hold the title.

In the Slavic languages of many Eastern Orthodox countries the term "pope" (поп, піп; pop) means "priest"; these include Russian, Ukrainian, Serbian, and Bulgarian. The Romanian popă has the same meaning.

== See also ==
- Ab (Semitic)
- Catholic Church
- Honorific
- List of Coptic Orthodox popes of Alexandria (Bishops of Alexandria)
- List of Greek Orthodox patriarchs of Alexandria
- List of Patriarchs of Alexandria
- List of popes (Bishops of Rome)
- Pope
- Pope of the Coptic Orthodox Church of Alexandria
