= El Palmar de Troya =

Coordinates: 37°03′45″N 5°48′15″W

- Municipality
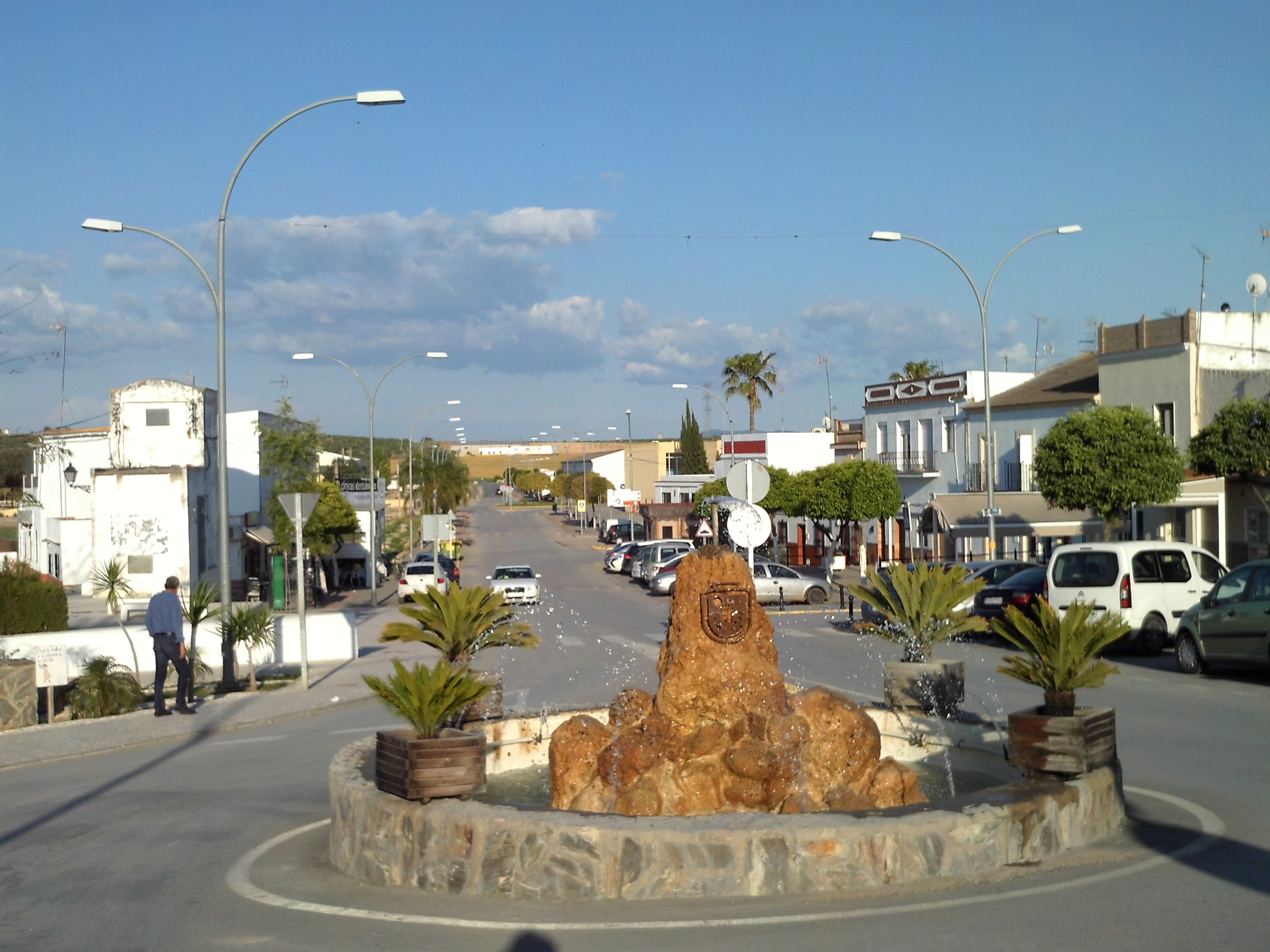

- Flag Coat of arms
- Interactive map of El Palmar de Troya
- Country: Spain
- Autonomous Community: Andalusia
- Province: Seville
- Comarca: Bajo Guadalquivir

Government
  - Mayor: Juan Carlos González García (PSOE)

Area
  - Total: 33.16 km^{2} (12.80 sq mi)

Population (2025-01-01)
  - Total: 2,301
  - Density: 69.39/km^{2} (179.7/sq mi)
- Website: www.elpalmardetroya.es

El Palmar de Troya (lit. "the palm grove of Troy") is a municipality in south-west Spain in the province of Seville, in the autonomous community of Andalusia. In 2018, it became the province's 106th municipality after it seceded from Utrera. As of 2019 it has a population of 2,340.

== History ==
Although there are historical data from Roman times and from the 13th century, when it belonged to the Moorish Band, the current settlement is mainly due to the relatives of the Republican prisoners who, after the civil war, built the Torre del Águila reservoir.

It was part of the municipality of Utrera until 2018, from which, after a secession process, it became independent on 3 October 2018.

== Palmarian Christian Church ==
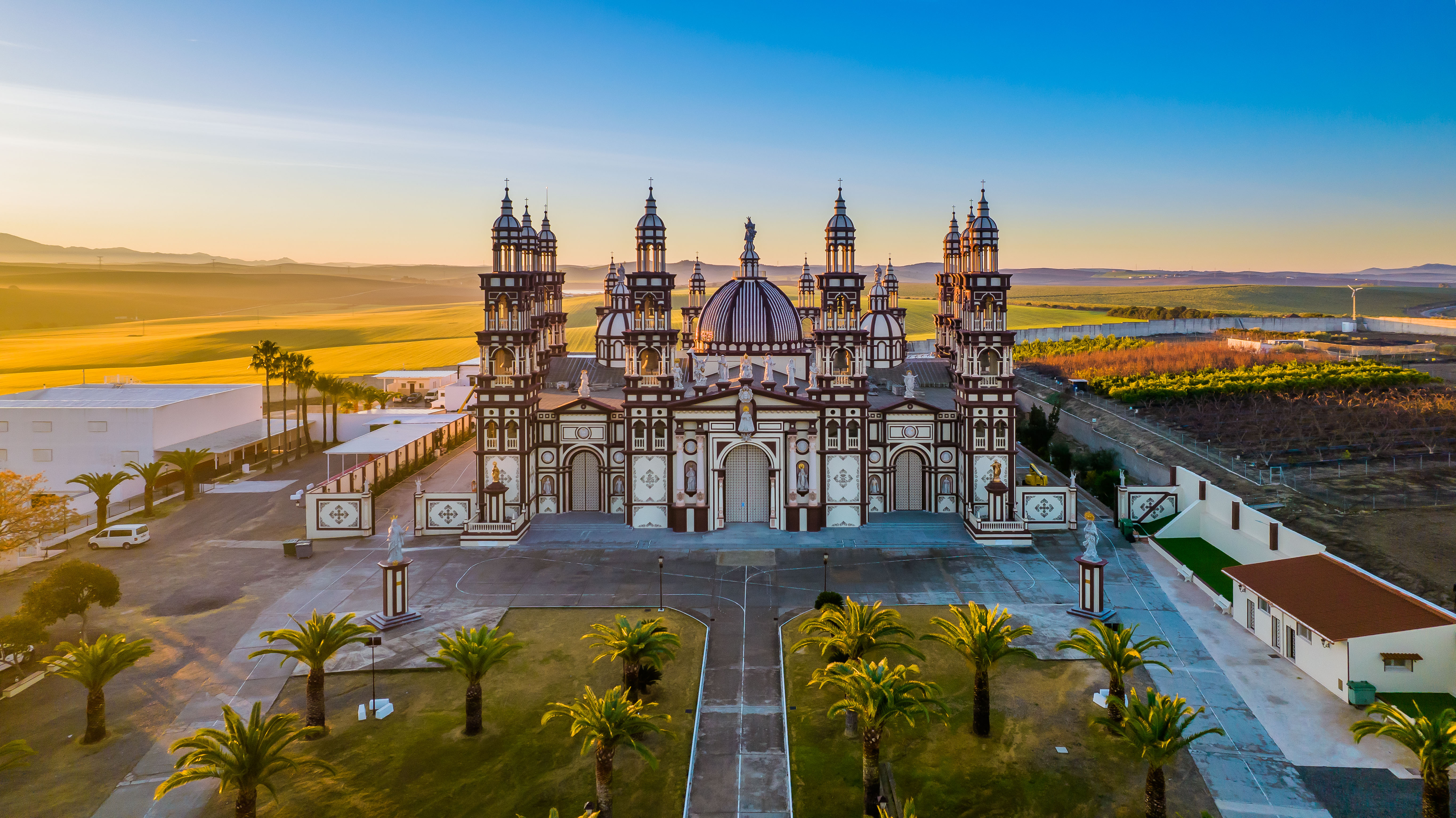
The cathedral of the Palmarian Christian Church

Nowadays, the municipality is particularly known for the Palmarian Christian Church, a schismatic Catholic sect founded by Clemente Domínguez y Gómez, known as "Pope Gregory XVII" in the Palmarian Christian faith since 6 August 1978 as a result of alleged apparitions of the Virgin Mary (Our Lady of Palmar) and of Jesus Christ on the site from the 1960s. He later asserted the claim to be the rightful pope of the Catholic Church, instead of the elected Cardinal Albino Luciani, who took the name of John Paul I. The Church is based at the Cathedral-Basilica of Our Crowned Mother of Palmar.
