= Theresa Russell filmography =

American actress

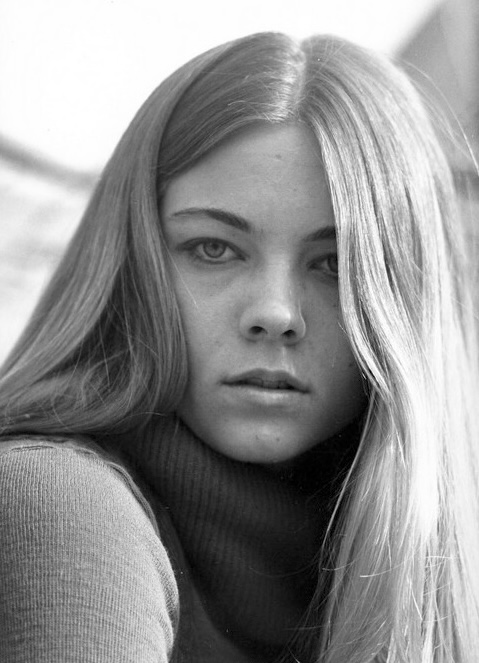
Russell in a publicity still for Straight Time (1978)

Theresa Russell is an American actress who began her career in a supporting role in Elia Kazan's The Last Tycoon (1976), playing the daughter of a prominent film executive. In 1978, she starred opposite Dustin Hoffman in the critically acclaimed crime drama Straight Time, following a lead role in the CBS miniseries Blind Ambition, portraying Maureen Dean, the wife of U.S. White House Counsel John Dean.

Her next role was a lead in English filmmaker Nicolas Roeg's controversial thriller Bad Timing (1980), which earned critical praise, in which Russell portrayed an American woman in Vienna who enters a dysfunctional relationship with a psychoanalyst. Bad Timing marked the first of six projects Russell and Roeg would collaborate on following their marriage in 1982; subsequent collaborations include the drama Eureka (1983); the experimental alternate history film Insignificance (1985), in which Russell portrayed Marilyn Monroe; and the dramas Track 29 (1989) and Cold Heaven (1991).

Russell had a mainstream commercial breakthrough portraying a serial killer in Bob Rafelson's neo-noir film Black Widow (1987). Other roles from this time included the crime drama Physical Evidence (1989), co-starring Burt Reynolds, and Sondra Locke's thriller Impulse (1990). In 1991, Russell starred as a prostitute in Ken Russell's satirical drama Whore, followed by Steven Soderbergh's experimental black-and-white feature, Kafka, co-starring Jeremy Irons.

After appearing in a number of independent films in the mid-1990s, Russell had a supporting role in the commercially successful neo-noir Wild Things (1998), and the critically acclaimed drama The Believer (2001). In 2005, she had a supporting role on the HBO miniseries Empire Falls, followed by a minor part in Sam Raimi's Spider-Man 3 (2007).

== Film ==
Year	Title	Role	Director(s)	Notes	Ref.
1976	The Last Tycoon	Cecilia Brady	Elia Kazan		
1978	Straight Time	Jenny Mercer	Ulu Grosbard		
1980	Bad Timing	Milena Flaherty	Nicolas Roeg		
1982	Tenebre	Anne (voice)	Dario Argento	English version, dubbing voice for Daria Nicolodi	
1983	Eureka	Tracy McCann Maillot Van Horn	Nicolas Roeg		
1984	The Razor's Edge	Sophie MacDonald	John Byrum		
1985	Insignificance	The Actress	Nicolas Roeg		
1987	Black Widow	Catharine Petersen	Bob Rafelson		
1987	Aria	King Zog	Nicolas Roeg	Segment: Un ballo in maschera	
1988	Track 29	Linda Henry	Nicolas Roeg		
1989	Physical Evidence	Jenny Hudson	Michael Crichton		
1990	Impulse	Lottie Mason	Sondra Locke		
1991	Whore	Liz	Ken Russell		
1991	Cold Heaven	Marie Davenport	Nicolas Roeg		
1991	Kafka	Gabriela	Steven Soderbergh		
1993	Thicker Than Water	Debbie / Jo	Marc Evans	Television film	
1994	Being Human	The Storyteller	Bill Forsyth		
1995	Trade-Off	Jackie Daniels	Andrew Lane	Television film	
1995	Hotel Paradise	Bride	Nicolas Roeg	Short film	
1995	The Spy Within	Mary Ann Curran	Steve Railsback		
1995	A Young Connecticut Yankee in King Arthur's Court	Morgan le Fay	Ralph L. Thomas		
1995	The Grotesque	Lady Harriet Coal	John-Paul Davidson	Alternate titles: Grave Indiscretion; Gentlemen Don't Eat Poets	
1996	Once You Meet a Stranger	Margo Anthony	Tommy Lee Wallace	Television film	
1996	Public Enemies	Kate "Ma" Barker	Mark L. Lester		
1996	The Proposition	Catherine Morgan	Strathford Hamilton		
1998	Wild Things	Sandra Van Ryan	John McNaughton		
1998	Running Woman	Emily Russo	Rachel Samuels; David Blass		
2000	Luckytown	Stella	Paul Nicholas		
2001	The Believer	Lina Moebius	Henry Bean		
2001	Earth vs. the Spider	Trixie Grillo	Scott Ziehl	Television film	
2002	The House Next Door	Helen Schmidt	Joey Travolta		
2002	Passionada	Lois Vargas	Dan Ireland		
2002	Now & Forever	Dori Wilson	Bob Clark		
2002	Project Viper	Dr. Nancy Burnham	Jim Wynorski	Television film	
2003	Love Comes Softly	Sarah Graham	Michael Landon Jr.	Television film	
2003	Chasing Alice		Ralph Hemecker	Television film	
2003	Water Under the Bridge	Jackie O'Connor	Clark Brigham	Alternate title: Save It for Later	
2003	The Box	Dora Baker	Richard Pepin		
2005	Blind Injustice	Joanna Bartlett	Rex Piano	Television film	
2007	Spider-Man 3	Emma Marko	Sam Raimi		
2007	On the Doll	Diane	Thomas Mignone		
2008	Chinaman's Chance: America's Other Slaves	Mrs. Williams	Aki Aleong		
2008	Jolene	Aunt Kay	Dan Ireland		
2008	Dark World	Nicole	Zia Mojabi		
2009	He's Just Not That into You	Mrs. Marks	Ken Kwapis	Scenes deleted	
2009	16 to Life	Louise	Becky Smith		
2011	Rid of Me	Mrs. Lockwood	James Westby		
2011	Born to Ride	Frances Callahan	James Fargo		
2011	1 Out of 7	Lexi's Mom	York Shackleton		
2012	The Legends of Nethiah	Nethiah's Mother	Russ Emanuel		
2012	Liz & Dick	Sara Taylor	Lloyd Kramer	Television film	
2014	A Winter Rose	Rachal Love	Riz Story		
2014	Moving Mountains	Trish Bragg	Jeanie M. Clark		

== Television ==
Year	Title	Role	Notes	Ref.
1979	Blind Ambition	Maureen Dean	Miniseries, 1 episode	
1993	A Woman's Guide to Adultery	Rose	Miniseries, 3 episodes	
1999	G vs E	Reesa Tussel	Episode: "To Be or Not to Be Evil"	
2000	Nash Bridges	Ellen Holiday / Sarah Williams	Episodes: "Jackpot: Parts 1 & 2"	
2002	Glory Days	Hazel Walker	Main role, 9 episodes	
2005	Empire Falls	Charlene	TV miniseries, 2 episodes	
2006	Law & Order: Criminal Intent	Regina Reid	Episode: "On Fire"	
2007	American Heiress	Jordan Wakefield	Recurring role, 14 episodes	
2009	Fringe	Rebecca Kibner	Episode: "Momentum Deferred"	
2010	Cold Case	Rachel Malone (2010)	Episode: "One Fall"	
2012–2013	Delete	Fiona	Miniseries, 2 episodes	
