= Hotel Paradise (1995 film) =

Short film by Nicolas Roeg

Hotel Paradise is a 1995 29 minute short film by director Nicolas Roeg and writer Michael Allin starring Theresa Russell, Vincent D'Onofrio, and Jimmy Batten. It was presented at the Montreal World Film Festival as part of trilogy with Sweeties by Cynzia Th. Torrini in Italian and Devilish Education by Janusz Majewski in Polish. The film was scored by Harry Gregson-Williams.
