= Track 29 =

1988 film by Nicolas Roeg

- Theatrical release poster
- Directed by: Nicolas Roeg
- Written by: Dennis Potter
- Produced by: Rick McCallum
- Starring: Theresa Russell; Gary Oldman; Colleen Camp; Sandra Bernhard; Seymour Cassel; Christopher Lloyd
- Cinematography: Alex Thomson
- Edited by: Tony Lawson
- Music by: Stanley Myers
- Production company: HandMade Films
- Distributed by: Island Pictures; Cannon Films
- Release dates: 5 August 1988 (UK); 9 September 1988 (US)
- Running time: 91 minutes
- Countries: United Kingdom; United States
- Language: English
- Budget: $5 million
- Box office: $429,028 (US)

Track 29 is a 1988 psychological drama film directed by Nicolas Roeg and starring Theresa Russell, Gary Oldman, Colleen Camp, Sandra Bernhard, Seymour Cassel, and Christopher Lloyd. It was produced by George Harrison's HandMade Films with Rick McCallum. The film was nominated for and won a few awards at regional film festivals. The writer, Dennis Potter, adapted his earlier television play, Schmoedipus (1974), changing the setting from London to the United States. It was filmed in Wilmington and Wrightsville Beach, North Carolina.

== Plot ==
In rural Wilmington, North Carolina, Linda Henry lives a solitary and unfulfilled life with her husband, Henry Henry, a doctor who spends the majority of his free time tinkering with model trains. At his clinic, Henry carries on an affair with a nurse, Ms. Stein, unbeknownst to Linda. While dining at a cafe with her friend Arlanda, Linda encounters Martin, a British hitchhiker who was born in North Carolina but raised in England; he has arrived in the United States in search of his birthmother.

Later that night, Linda is frightened to see Martin standing outside her home. He confronts her the following day while she swims in her swimming pool, and suggests he is the biological son she gave up for adoption while a teenager. She initially disbelieves him, but he provides intimate details about the woman who raised him, who was in fact the British housekeeper of Linda's family. Martin says that she accompanied him back to England with him shortly after his birth. Martin begins to exhibit increasingly childlike behavior toward Linda, expressing sadness over his lack of having his biological mother in his life. Linda responds in a maternal manner.

Linda and Martin go out for a dinner together at a local bar, but the waiter observes Linda alone at the table, talking to herself and crying. Meanwhile, Linda believes herself to be engaging with Martin, who is seemingly a figment of her imagination. She recounts to Martin his conception, which occurred during a rape Linda suffered while attending a local carnival. The two return home as Linda continues to get progressively drunk, and Martin's behavior vacillates between being increasingly childlike and Oedipal in nature. Meanwhile, Henry and Nurse Stein attend a local convention for model train enthusiasts. Afterward, Henry tells Nurse Stein he wants her to join him when he accepts a new job out of state.

At home, Linda has a vision of a semi-truck crashing through her bedroom while Martin destroys Henry's elaborate model train set. He subsequently sings and plays Linda a song on the piano that moves Linda to tears. After Martin leaves, Linda awakens in the living room in the middle of the night, and hysterically calls Arlanda for help. Linda tells Arlanda she let the "boy they met in the diner" into her home, but Arlanda seems clueless as to what she is referring to. Linda proceeds to recount the story of her rape, pregnancy, and subsequent placing of her newborn for adoption.

Henry returns to find Arlanda and Linda at the house. When Arlanda goes to get Linda something to drink, Henry begins to slap Linda, but is stopped when an enraged Arlanda re-enters the room. Linda calmly escorts Arlanda out of the house, assuring her everything is fine. Linda, in her dissociated state, envisions a naked Martin stabbing Henry to death upstairs amongst his train set. The next morning, Linda fashions herself in an elegant dress and departs the house, hearing the voice of Henry repeatedly calling her name. She ignores it, and drives away. Inside the house, a pool of blood—ostensibly that of the murdered Henry—has soaked through the upstairs floor, and drips from the living room ceiling.

== Cast ==
- Theresa Russell as Linda Henry
- Gary Oldman as Martin
- Christopher Lloyd as Henry Henry
- Colleen Camp as Arlanda
- Sandra Bernhard as Nurse Stein
- Seymour Cassel as Dr. Bernard Fairmont

== Schmoedipus ==
The film was based on a script by Dennis Potter, which was adapted from Potter's television play Schmoedipus, which aired in 1974. The plot concerned a middle aged woman, Elizabeth (Anna Cropper), who is visited by a stranger, Glen (Tim Curry), claiming to be the illegitimate son she gave away at birth.

== Production ==
Potter adapted the play into a feature film, shifting the location to the USA. The film was originally going to be directed by Joseph Losey for the BBC - the plan was for the movie to premiere on British television but be shown theatrically abroad. Rick McCallum and Kenith Trodd were to produce. By July 1983 filming was set to start in Texas in August, with a cast including Vanessa Redgrave (mother), Anthony Higgins (son), Lee Marvin (husband) and Lucille Fletcher. However only days before filming was to start, the BBC insisted the film be shot in 16mm not 35mm so the American financing pulled out and the film was cancelled. Losey went on to make Steaming instead and died in 1984.

Rick McCallum then produced Castaway with director Nic Roeg and enjoyed the experience so much he suggested Roeg direct Track 29. Roeg responded to the material, electing to shoot Potter's 1982 script. Finance was secured from Handmade Films.

Denis O'Brien of HandMade Films was reportedly very encouraging of the film during shooting but when he saw the final film he was alarmed by the incest plot and demanded cuts. Some cuts were made.

== Reception ==
=== Box office ===
The film was not a box office success.

=== Critical reception ===
Janet Maslin of The New York Times thought the film missed the mark:

Though the screenwriter and the director clearly share certain affinities, their collective efforts on Track 29 ... amount to overkill, particularly since the direction is so laden with contempt for the characters... Though Mr. Roeg's films can often be perverse (and startlingly, bracingly so), they are rarely this silly. Nor are they this maddening, since Track 29 does contain the seeds of something tantalizing. Linda's attempt to come to terms with her past through a wildly unpredictable, even dangerous fantasy has the stamp of Mr. Potter's better material, but it has been made too mindless to have any impact. The real urgency of Mr. Oldman's performance, and the wicked blandness of Mr. Lloyd's, seem regrettably wasted, under the circumstances.

However, Roger Ebert of the Chicago Sun-Times rated it 3 stars out of his 4-star rating system and found the film well done but painful, opening his review writing:

Somebody asked me if I liked this movie, and I had to answer that I did not, but then I realized once again what an inadequate word "like" is. The reason I didn't like "Track 29" is that the film is unlikable - perhaps deliberately so. But that doesn't make it a bad film, and it probably makes it a more interesting one. Like many of the strange, convoluted works of Nicolas Roeg (Don't Look Now, Bad Timing, Eureka, Insignificance), it is bad-tempered, kinky and misogynistic. But not every film is required to massage us with pleasure. Some are allowed to be abrasive and frustrating, to make us think.

Bernard Rose later praised the film:

Very underrated movie. Nic has such a strong influence as a director, such a strong direct physical contact with the manufacturing of the film. When you look at Track 29, it’s less Dennis Potter than other Potter things. It’s still very much Potter’s script. There were wonderful things in it: the train sets, and Theresa and Gary. It had all these Oedipal things going on in it.

== Notes ==
- Cook, John R. (1998). Dennis Potter : a life on screen. Manchester University Press.
