= Theresa Russell =

American actress (born 1957)

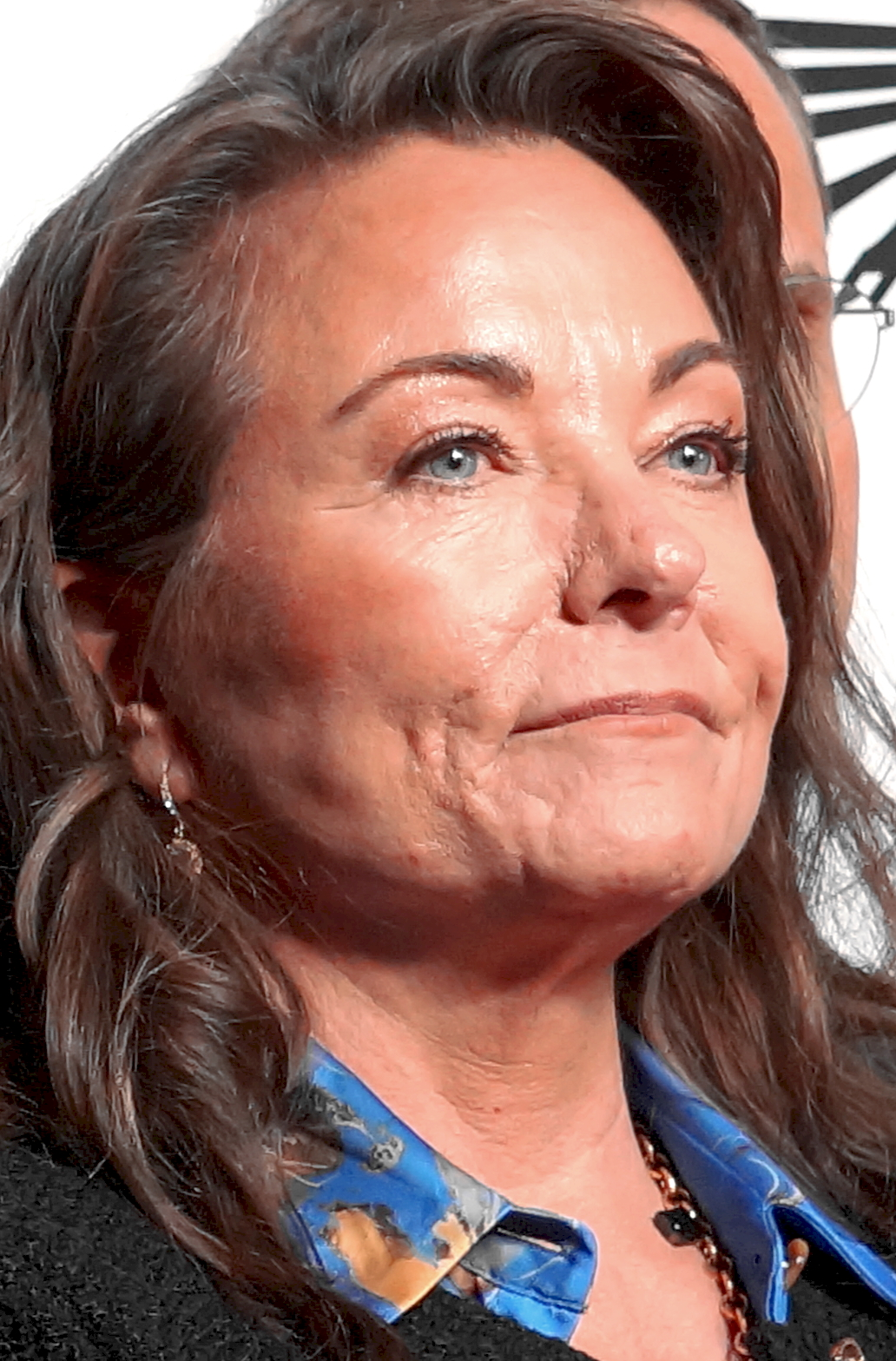
- Russell at Film Fest Gent, 2025
- Born: Theresa Lynn Paup; March 20, 1957 (age 69); San Diego, California, U.S.
- Other name: Theresa Roeg
- Education: Lee Strasberg Institute
- Occupation: Actress
- Years active: 1976–present
- Spouse(s): Nicolas Roeg (m. 1982; div. late 1990s)
- Partner: Mike Melvoin (2003–2012; his death)
- Children: 2

Theresa Lynn Russell (née Paup; born March 20, 1957) is an American actress whose career spans over four decades. Her filmography includes over 50 feature films, ranging from mainstream to independent and experimental films. She is known for her frequent portrayals of brooding, troubled, and disturbed characters, as well as for her multiple collaborations with her husband, director Nicolas Roeg.

Russell began modeling as a teenager, which brought her to the attention of film producer Sam Spiegel, who facilitated her casting in Elia Kazan's The Last Tycoon (1976), in which she played the daughter of a prominent film executive. In 1978, she starred opposite Dustin Hoffman in the critically acclaimed crime drama Straight Time. Her next role was a lead in English filmmaker Nicolas Roeg's controversial thriller Bad Timing (1980), which earned critical praise. Russell and Roeg began a romance while shooting the film, and it marked the first of six projects they would collaborate on following their 1982 marriage. She next appeared in Roeg's drama Eureka (1983), followed by the John Byrum-directed The Razor's Edge (1984). Russell portrayed Marilyn Monroe in Roeg's experimental alternate history film Insignificance (1985), followed by a lead role as a serial killer in Bob Rafelson's neo-noir film Black Widow (1987), which garnered her significant commercial attention.

Russell continued to collaborate with Roeg throughout the late 1980s and early 1990s, appearing in a Roeg-directed segment of the anthology film Aria (1987), as well as the features Track 29 (1989) and Cold Heaven (1991). Other roles from this time included the crime dramas Physical Evidence (1989) and Impulse (1990). In 1991, Russell starred as a prostitute in Ken Russell's satirical drama Whore, followed by Steven Soderbergh's experimental black-and-white feature, Kafka.

After appearing in a number of independent films in the mid-1990s, Russell had a supporting role in the commercially successful neo-noir Wild Things (1998), and the critically acclaimed drama The Believer (2001). In 2005, she had a supporting role on the HBO miniseries Empire Falls, followed by a minor part in Sam Raimi's Spider-Man 3 (2007). From the late 2000s through the 2010s, she appeared in several independent films and guest-starred on the television series Fringe (2009) and Cold Case (2010), as well as the television biopic Liz & Dick (2012)

== Early life ==
Russell was born Theresa Lynn Paup on March 20, 1957 in San Diego, California, the eldest of three children to teenage mother Carole Platt (née Mall) and Jerry Russell Paup, both natives of Burbank. Her father was in the United States Navy, and was stationed in San Diego at the time of her birth. One of Russell's grandfathers was a farmer originally from Iowa. When she was five years old, Russell's parents divorced, and her father relocated to Mexico. Her mother subsequently remarried, and moved the family to Los Angeles County, where Russell was raised in Burbank.

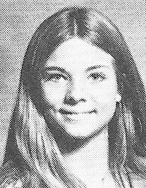
Russell's 1973 high school yearbook photo

Through her mother's marriage to her stepfather, she has two half-siblings. Russell has said she grew up in poverty, and that at times her family required food stamps to survive. She had a turbulent relationship with her stepfather, whom she described as "hideous", "incapable" and "an asshole," and by age 13, she had begun experimenting with recreational drugs. Despite her early struggles, Russell commented in 1991: "I hate it when actors talk about what a hard time they had as kids. That was just my life. It wasn't horrible. When you're free, white, and over 21, how hard can it be? Get over it." As an adolescent, Russell was frequently placed in charge of her younger siblings; it was during this time that she became interested in acting after regularly watching classic films on cable television, particularly film noirs.

Russell attended Burbank High School, where she had her first acting experience portraying the titular character in a stage production of Gypsy. At age fourteen, she was approached while walking on a street in Los Angeles by a photographer who suggested she model. Suspecting the photographer merely wanted to exploit her, Russell requested that he meet her mother first, to which he obliged. She subsequently began modeling for a fashion photographer who was a friend of her mother. "I ended up having what I realize now was a long, almost like a Lolita/Humbert Humbert relationship with him—without the sex. He was madly in love with me and took pictures of me a lot. He would come round and we would go off and shoot pictures up in the mountains."

Russell dropped out of high school at 16 and moved onto a horse ranch with a 28-year-old boyfriend who worked as a primal scream therapist, whom she later described as "one of the most fucked-up people I have ever met." She enrolled at the Lee Strasberg Institute in West Hollywood to study acting at age 17, studying there for approximately three years.

== Career ==
=== 1976–1979: Career beginnings ===
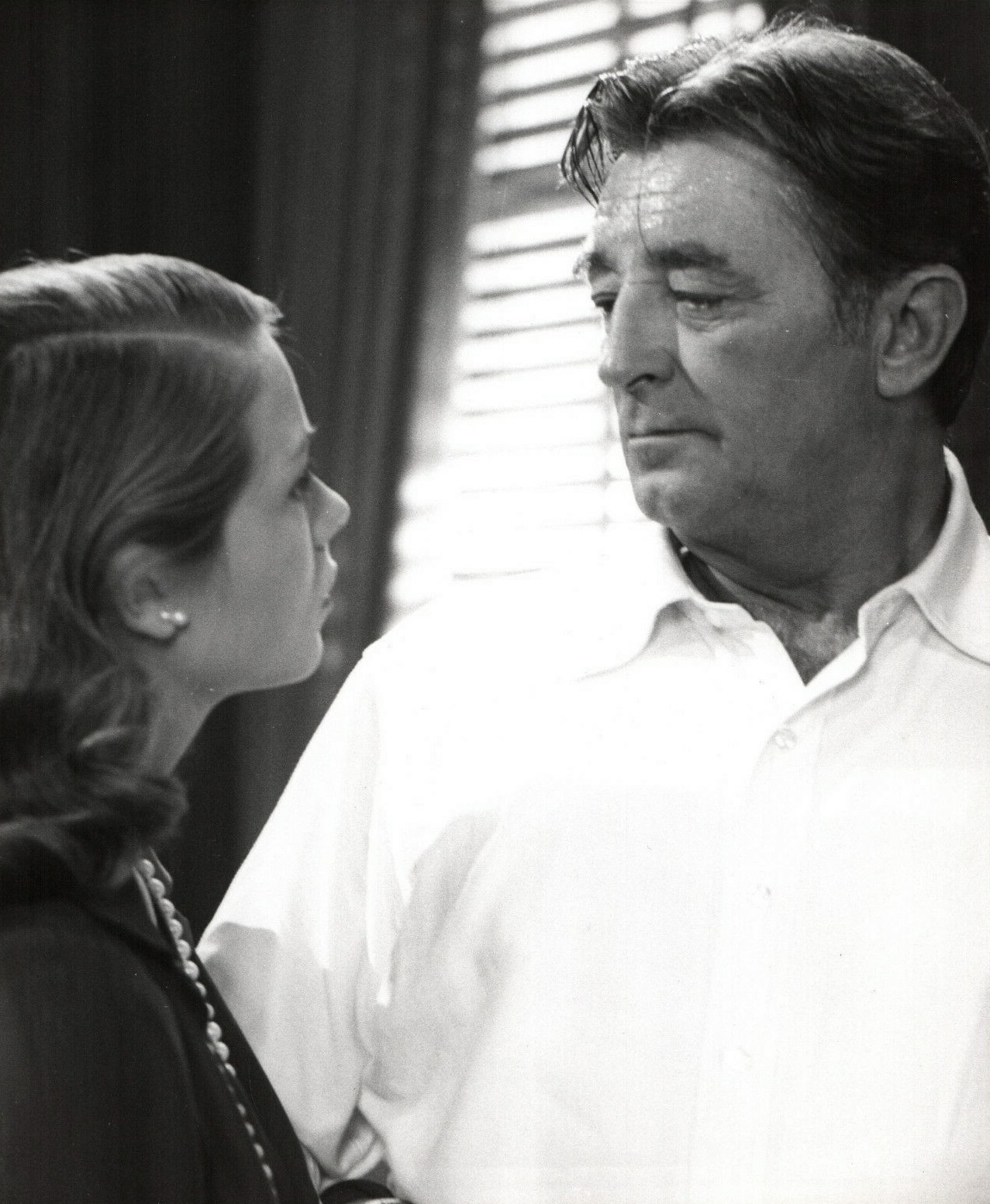
Russell and Robert Mitchum in The Last Tycoon (1976)

Through her modeling work, Russell met photographer Peter Douglas, son of Kirk Douglas, who introduced her to film producer Sam Spiegel in 1975. At the time, Spiegel was beginning production of a film adaptation of F. Scott Fitzgerald's The Last Tycoon, directed by Elia Kazan and adapted for the screen by Harold Pinter. Spiegel suggested that Russell audition for the role of Cecilia Brady, the daughter of a studio executive (played by Robert Mitchum), a part in which she was ultimately cast. Russell said she was initially intimidated during filming due to her lack of screen acting experience: "I just felt like I needed to do my job. I couldn't relate to all of these famous people." For her credit in the film, she adopted the surname Russell, the given name of her paternal grandfather, which she used professionally from thereon.

In a retrospective interview, Russell commented on her casting with ambivalence, saying: "Sam [Spiegel] loved to be seen with child-girls on his arm. I was 16 years old and still living at home, and he took me to the Bistro and tried to stick his tongue down my throat. He thought he could buy and sell people." Kazan corroborated this, recalling: "Sam suggested her. I had strong reservations, saw some values but more drawbacks. It was obvious to me, and later conversations with Theresa verified this, that Sam had, for a long time, tried to gentle her into his bed." According to Russell, prior to shooting the film, Spiegel attempted to have her sign a contract placing her under his control for a nine-year period. Reflecting on the incident, Russell said:

I was not a bimbo. I called a lawyer. Sam was furious. He said he would see to it that I got no billing in the movie. And to this day, if you ever see any advertising for The Last Tycoon, my name is in teensy-weensy type. I was completely left out of the publicity for the movie. He was unrelenting. I asked him, 'If I sign your contract, what if I want to do some role in some other picture?' He said, 'You'll have to come to my boat in the South of France.' Yeah, and what happens then?

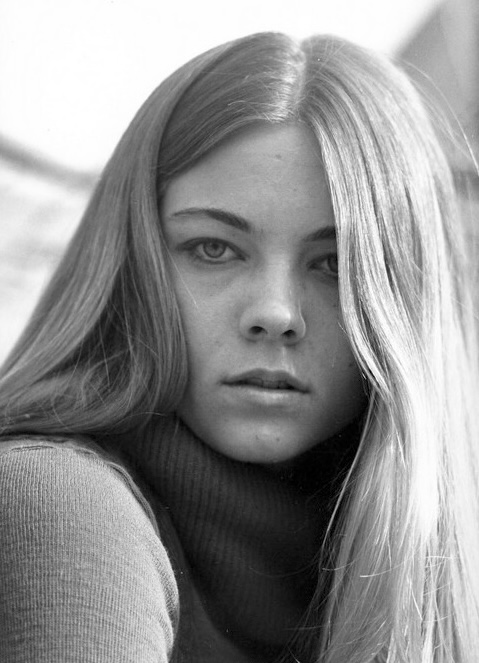
Russell in a 1978 publicity shot for Straight Time

The following year, Russell was cast as a troubled young woman who becomes associated with a criminal (played by Dustin Hoffman) in director Ulu Grosbard's drama Straight Time. Vincent Canby of The New York Times praised Russell in his review of the film, writing: "Miss Russell, who was so good in The Last Tycoon, is an extremely appealing actress, with a kind of contemporary authority, but she looks so classy, so understated-chic, that she suggests an upper-class girl whose path would cross Max's only at the beach, or maybe at a singles bar."

In 1979, Russell starred in the miniseries Blind Ambition for CBS, a biographical drama focusing on the Watergate scandal, in which she portrayed Maureen Dean, the wife of White House Counsel John Dean (played by Martin Sheen).

=== 1980–1986: Collaborations with Nicolas Roeg ===
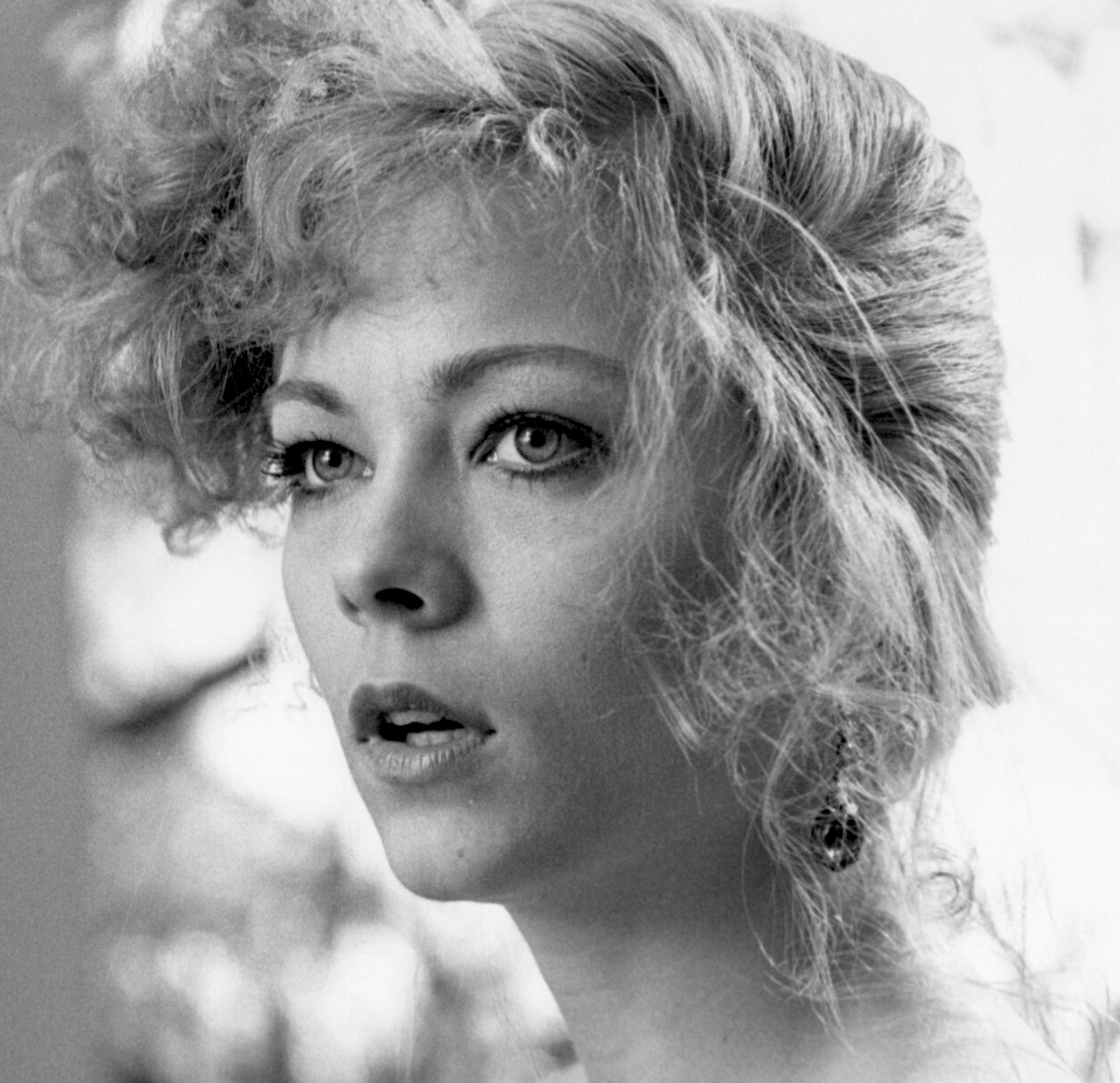
Russell in Bad Timing (1980)

In 1979, Russell was cast as Milena Flaherty, a young American living in Vienna who enters a dysfunctional relationship with a psychoanalyst (played by Art Garfunkel) in Bad Timing (1980). It marked the first of six films Russell would go on to star in directed by English filmmaker Nicolas Roeg, whom she began a relationship with after completing filming. Bad Timing was subject to controversy upon release due to its graphic depiction of sexuality and rape, though Russell's performance was praised by critic Roger Ebert, who wrote: "If there is any reason to see this film, however, it is the performance by Theresa Russell (who was Dustin Hoffman's lover in Straight Time). She is only 22 or 23, and yet her performance is astonishingly powerful. She will be in better films, I hope, and is the only participant who need not be ashamed of this one." Russell became a muse of Roeg's, and the two were married in 1982.

Following her role in Bad Timing, Russell performed the English audio dubbing of Daria Nicolodi's character in the giallo film Tenebre (1982), directed by Dario Argento. Her next on-screen role was in Roeg's drama Eureka (1983), portraying the covetous daughter of a Klondike prospector, played by Gene Hackman. The film was a box-office bomb, grossing $123,572 against an $11 million budget and received mixed reviews from critics, though Roger Ebert praised Russell's performance as "brilliant."

The following year, she starred opposite Bill Murray in John Byrum's The Razor's Edge, an adaptation of the W. Somerset Maugham novel of the same name. The film was a financial failure, grossing under $2 million against its $13 million budget. The film was met with largely unfavorable reviews, though Russell's performance received some praise, with Janet Maslin of The New York Times noting it as possessing "a welcome vitality."

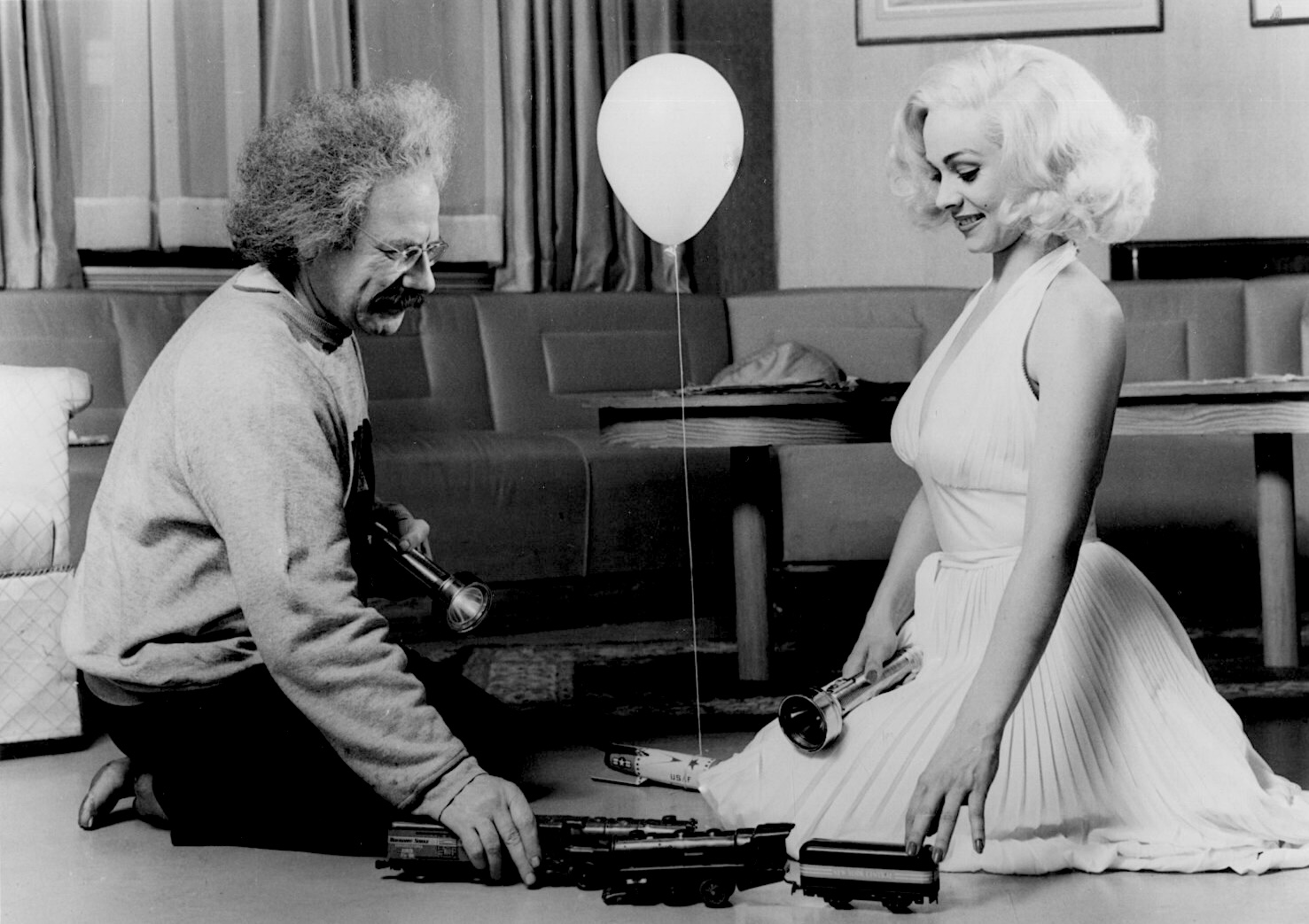
Russell and Michael Emil in Insignificance (1985)

She then portrayed Marilyn Monroe in Roeg's experimental alternate history film Insignificance (1985), based on the play by Terry Johnson, in which she appeared opposite Gary Busey and Tony Curtis. In retrospect, Russell described the role as "really challenging because at first I did not want to do it. That was a pile of horseshit I didn’t want to step in. Everybody had these preconceived ideas, and I didn’t want [to do] a caricature. That was kind of tricky to get my head around." Critic Roger Ebert praised her performance in the film, writing: "She doesn't really look very much like Monroe, but what does it matter? The blond hair and the red lips are there, and so is the manner, which has been imitated so often, and so badly, that the imitators prove that Monroe was a special case. Russell doesn't imitate. She builds her performance from the ground up, and it works to hold the movie together."

=== 1987–1998: Mainstream recognition ===
In 1987, Russell gained mainstream exposure for her portrayal of Catharine Peterson, a serial killer who seduces and murders wealthy men in Bob Rafelson's noir thriller Black Widow, co-starring Debra Winger. Russell's performance earned praise; Vincent Canby of The New York Times wrote that her "clear-eyed sweetness... adds unexpected dimension to the homicidal Catharine," while Roger Ebert praised her acting and screen chemistry with Winger.

The same year, she appeared in a Nicolas Roeg-directed segment (a film version of the opera Un ballo in maschera) of the anthology film Aria. The following year, she appeared in Roeg's black comedy Track 29 (1988), playing a young Southern woman who meets a mysterious British drifter, played by Gary Oldman. Roger Ebert, commenting on her performance, wrote: "Russell, who has survived the convoluted terrain of many of Roeg’s movies (he is her husband), seems at home in this twisted landscape, and [she and Oldman] work their characters up into an orgy of mutual laceration."

Next, Russell portrayed a public defender in the crime drama Physical Evidence (1988), starring Burt Reynolds and directed by Michael Crichton. The film received largely unfavorable reviews from critics, with some, such as Rita Kempley of The Washington Post, singling out Russell's acting as a primary fault. Roger Ebert, who had previously championed many of Russell's performances, suggested in his review of the film that she and Reynolds merely lacked chemistry.

In 1990, Russell was cast in Sondra Locke's Impulse, in which she portrayed a police officer who is drawn into the world of prostitution while posing undercover as a prostitute in Los Angeles. The following year, Russell again played a prostitute in Ken Russell's satirical drama Whore (1991), based on the play by David Hines. Though the film received a mixed reception from critics, Russell's performance was praised by The New York Times and Roger Ebert of the Chicago Sun-Times. Russell commented that she found making the film emotionally taxing, equating it to "doing two marathons underwater. But I’m terribly proud of it."

Following Whore, Russell was cast in a lead role opposite Jeremy Irons in Steven Soderbergh's Kafka (1991), a black-and-white surrealist adaptation of several Franz Kafka stories. David Ansen of Newsweek felt that Russell was miscast in her role, while Variety noted, "with her untempered US accent, and flat readings, Russell sticks out like a sore thumb." She again united with her husband Roeg for his film Cold Heaven (also 1991), starring opposite Mark Harmon as a woman whose husband inexplicably rises from the dead.

In 1993, Russell starred in the British miniseries A Woman's Guide to Adultery, filmed in London and co-starring Sean Bean and Amanda Donohoe. Russell subsequently served as the narrator of the British drama film Being Human (1994), starring Robin Williams. In 1995, Russell appeared several projects, including the television film Trade-Off, the thriller The Spy Within, and A Young Connecticut Yankee in King Arthur's Court, an adaptation of A Connecticut Yankee in King Arthur's Court, in which she portrayed Morgan le Fay. The same year, she also starred in the comedy The Grotesque (1995), opposite Alan Bates and Sting. In 1996, Russell starred opposite Jacqueline Bisset in the television thriller film Once You Meet a Stranger, a remake of Alfred Hitchcock's Strangers on a Train (1951). The same year, she portrayed Ma Barker in the biographical crime film Public Enemies, opposite Alyssa Milano and Eric Roberts.

Russell next had a supporting role in the neo-noir thriller Wild Things (1998), playing the mother of a Florida teenager (Denise Richards) who becomes embroiled in a criminal investigation against her teacher, whom she claims assaulted her. The film was a box office success and went on to establish a cult following.

=== 1999–2014: Later film and television ===
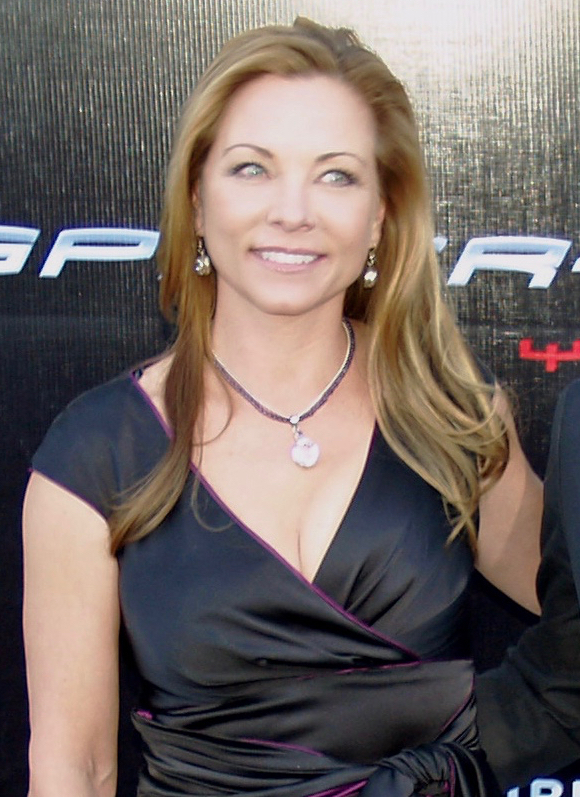
Russell at the 2007 premiere of Spider-Man 3

After appearing in the crime drama Luckytown (2000) opposite James Caan and Kirsten Dunst, Russell was then cast in The Believer (2001), a drama written and directed by Henry Bean, in which she starred opposite Ryan Gosling as a Jewish man who becomes a neo-Nazi. The film was critically acclaimed and received the Special Jury Prize—Drama at the 2001 Sundance Film Festival. The same year, Russell had a lead role opposite Dan Aykroyd in the Cinemax television sci-fi horror film Earth vs. the Spider.

In the early 2000s, Russell mainly appeared in low-budget and independent films, such as The House Next Door (2002), Now & Forever (2002), and The Box (2003). In 2005, she was cast in the role of Charlene in the HBO miniseries Empire Falls, an adaptation of the 2001 Richard Russo novel of the same name. Empire Falls received critical acclaim, including a Golden Globe Award nomination for Best Miniseries or Television Film and a Primetime Emmy Award nomination for Outstanding Miniseries.

She also appeared in the supporting role of Emma Marko in Spider-Man 3 as the wife of Flint Marko (Thomas Haden Church). The following year, she appeared in the independent drama Jolene, starring Jessica Chastain and Dermot Mulroney, portraying the aunt of a troubled teenaged girl. She had a minor role playing the mother of Scarlett Johansson's character in the romantic comedy He's Just Not That into You (2009), though her scenes were eventually cut from the film. Also in 2009, Russell had a minor role in the independent drama On the Doll, followed by two television appearances: a guest-starring role on the sci-fi series Fringe, and another guest appearance in the seventh season of the crime drama Cold Case.

In 2012, after having taken a two-year hiatus from acting, she appeared in the Lifetime television film Liz & Dick, playing Sara Taylor, the mother of Elizabeth Taylor (portrayed by Lindsay Lohan). Reflecting on the role in a later interview, she described the film as "not good... I thought, ‘What am I doing here?’ It didn’t make me happy." In 2013, she had a guest role on the miniseries Delete, about a hacker who discovers an artificial intelligence system.

In 2014, Russell appeared in the independent music drama A Winter Rose, co-starring Paul Sorvino and Edward Furlong. The same year, she starred in Moving Mountains, another independent feature about a woman living in a coal mining community in West Virginia.

== Acting style and reception ==
I’m a complete glutton for punishment. You’ve heard actors say it before, but I was one of the first people to say, "If I read something and it frightens me, I’m compelled to do it."

— Russell on her choices in film roles, 2012

Russell considers herself a method actor, which she attributes to her training and study of Stanislavski at the Lee Strasberg Institute. Over the course of her career, Russell became known for her frequent portrayals of brooding, disturbed, and troubled characters. Despite this, in a 1988 interview she expressed interest in portraying a wide variety of roles: "I don’t always have to be in one kind of role. I’d like to do a Spielberg movie. Athletic stunts. I’d like to be a cowgirl. I know how to ride a horse. I could work in Europe all the time, but I’ve chosen not to. I’m from America. America? I’m from the Valley."

Bob Rafelson, who directed Russell in Black Widow (1987), praised her work ethic, saying: "I’ve never worked with a more dedicated and cooperative actress. Theresa has an extraordinarily open and strong aesthetic, but at the same time she’s one of the least complicated women I know. There are hundreds of performers who can’t talk unless one of their ears has been torn off, but Theresa comes from a completely different place—and that’s pretty amazing for such a young woman."

Russell was frequently admired by film critic Roger Ebert, who praised her performances in numerous films, including Bad Timing, Eureka, Insignificance, Track 29, Black Widow, Impulse, and Whore. Ebert described Russell as "an actress who likes characters who dance on the edge, who dare themselves to get into situations they’ll have to think fast to escape from." Writer Sam Wasson similarly commented that Russell "is attracted to the very things that repel most actors. In 1976's The Last Tycoon, her first movie (and Elia Kazan’s last), she is unafraid of seeming to do very little. Young actresses like to show you they can act by really "acting," but Russell, at only eighteen, knows what it means to be simple—and Kazan knows she knows." Ted Mahar, chief film critic of The Oregonian, wrote in 1985 that Russell "couldn't give a bad performance if she tried," while critic Glenn Erickson, writing in 2016, declared her "the boldest and bravest actress of the 1980s."

== Personal life ==
Russell married director Nicolas Roeg on February 12, 1982 in Westminster, London. Russell gave birth to two sons with Roeg: Statten (born 1983) and Maximillian (born 1985). The family resided primarily in Notting Hill, though Russell also maintained a residence in Los Angeles.

After her divorce from Roeg in the early 1990s, Russell returned to her native California and began dating jazz musician Mike Melvoin in 2003. The couple's relationship lasted nine years until his death in 2012.

== Honors ==
In October 2025, Russell served on the grand jury at Film Fest Gent in Ghent, Belgium, where she was honored with the Joseph Plateau Award for her contribution to film.

== In culture ==
The song "Athena" by the English rock band the Who, was written about a chance meeting with Pete Townshend, who was smitten and rejected by her. The single appears on the band's tenth studio album, It's Hard (1982).

She is the subject of a photocollage by David Hockney entitled Nude 17th June 1984 #10.

== Selected filmography ==
- The Last Tycoon (1976)
- Straight Time (1978)
- Bad Timing (1980)
- Eureka (1983)
- The Razor's Edge (1984)
- Insignificance (1985)
- Black Widow (1987)
- Track 29 (1988)
- Impulse (1990)
- Whore (1991)
- Cold Heaven (1991)
- Kafka (1991)
- Wild Things (1998)
- The Believer (2001)
- Spider-Man 3 (2007)

== Sources ==
- Duynslaegher, Patrick; Russell, Theresa (October 23, 2025). "FFG Actor's Talk 2025: Theresa Russell". Gent, Belgium: Film Fest Gent. Archived from the original on November 2, 2025 – via YouTube.
- Hellmann, Paul T. (2006). Historical Gazetteer of the United States. New York City, New York: Routledge. ISBN 978-1-135-94859-7.
- Kazan, Elia (2010). Kazan on Directing. New York City, New York: Vintage. ISBN 978-0-307-27704-6.
- Quigley, Eileen S., ed. (2004). International Television & Video Almanac (49th ed.). New York City, New York: Quigley Publishing Company. OCLC 54314754.
- Salwolke, Scott (1993). Nicolas Roeg, Film by Film. Jefferson, North Carolina: McFarland & Company. ISBN 978-0-899-50881-8.
- Schnakenberg, Robert (2015). The Big Bad Book of Bill Murray: A Critical Appreciation of the World's Finest Actor. Philadelphia, Pennsylvania: Quirk Books. ISBN 978-1-594-74822-6.
- Shelley, Peter (2018). Gene Hackman: The Life and Work. Jefferson, North Carolina: McFarland & Company. ISBN 978-1-476-63369-5.
- Sinyard, Neil (1991). The Films of Nicolas Roeg. London, England: Letts. ISBN 978-1-852-38166-0.
- Willis, John (1994). Screen World 1993: Comprehensive Pictorial and Statistical Record of the 1992 Movie Season. New York City, New York: Applause Books. ISBN 978-1-557-83175-0.
