= Now & Forever (2002 film) =

- Directed by: Bob Clark
- Written by: Bill Boyle
- Produced by: Leanne Arnott
- Starring: Adam Beach; Mia Kirshner; Gordon Tootoosis; Gabriel Olds; Callum Keith Rennie; Theresa Russell
- Cinematography: Jan Kiesser
- Edited by: Lenka Svab
- Music by: Paul Zaza
- Production company: Waterfront Pictures
- Distributed by: Illuminaire Entertainment
- Release date: August 15, 2002
- Running time: 101 minutes
- Country: Canada
- Language: English

Now & Forever is a 2002 romance film directed by Bob Clark.

== Plot ==
Against a backdrop of clashing cultures, John Myron and Angela Wilson find each other and over the years form a powerful bond. One tragic night, John rescues Angela from a wicked act of betrayal. Faced with its aftermath, Angela flees town, unaware that she has put into motion a dramatic and intense string of events that will forever change the course of their lives. Harboring a secret, John guides Angela to a shocking realization that will uncover the past. It is a dramatic contemporary love story combining elements of spirituality, heart and integrity.

== Cast ==
- Mia Kirshner as Angela Wilson
  - Alexandria Purvis as Young Angela Wilson
- Adam Beach as John Myron
  - Simon R. Baker as Young John Myron
- Gordon Tootoosis as Ghost Fox
- Theresa Russell as Dori Wilson
- Gabriel Olds as T.J. Bolt
- Callum Keith Rennie as Carl Mackie
- Nicholas Treeshin as Jake Dube
- Benson McCulloch as Brian Pressman
- Rob Roy as Alex Wilson
- Lyndon Linklater as Older Boy
- Bernelda Wheeler as Old Woman
- Dan MacDonald as Director
- Kent Allen as Max
- Calvin Chiefcalf as Reservation Officer
- Louisa Ferguson as Movie Director
- David Millbern as Guardian
- Colin Semenoff as Actor T.J.
- Stephan Fuchs as Actor T.J.

== Reception ==
On review aggregator Rotten Tomatoes it holds a 17% based on 12 reviews On Metacritic it holds a 27 out of 100 based on 6 reviews indicating “generally unfavorable reviews”
