= Delete (miniseries) =

- Genre: Drama
- Directed by: Steve Barron
- No. of seasons: 1
- No. of episodes: 3

Production
- Executive producer: Shawn Williamson
- Running time: 60 minutes

Original release
- Release: 2012 – 2013

Delete is a three-episode miniseries about a reporter and a young hacker who uncover an elusive artificial intelligence/multi-agent system dwelling in a smartphone, which has suddenly become fully autonomous, sentient, and malevolent.

== Premise ==
An artificial intelligence becomes autonomous and self-aware with intent to protect and perfect itself and enslave humanity. Discovered by a reporter and her hacker friend, they must create a second sentient artificial intelligence combat it.

== Cast ==
- Keir Gilchrist as Daniel
- Erin Karpluk as Jesse White
- Ryan Robbins as Agent Max Hollis
- Gil Bellows as Lt. General Michael Overson
- Matt Frewer as National Security Advisor Arthur Bowden
- Janet Kidder as Deputy Director Elizabeth Hardington
- Theresa Russell as Fiona
- Blu Mankuma as General Cassius Giles, USAF
- Andrew Airlie as Director Marcus Tremaine
- Seth Green as Lucifer
- Jaylee Hamidi as Keiko Watanabe (1 episode, 2013)
- Mike Azevedo as Pierre Garaneuf (1 episode, 2013)
- Mehdi Darvish as Plant Technician (1 episode, 2013)
- Graeme Duffy as Desmond Smith (1 episode, 2013)
- John Stewart as Train Conductor (1 episode, 2013)
- Alexander von Roon as Financial Reporter (1 episode, 2013

== Production details ==
Written and distributed by Sonar Entertainment of New York City, the series consists of two feature-length episodes. It was shot on location in Vancouver and produced by Vancouver-based Brightlight Pictures.

== Reception ==
The series won two Leo Awards, from the Motion Picture Arts & Sciences Foundation of British Columbia, for Best Picture Editing and Best Television Movie.

== See also ==
- Code Lyoko
- Code Lyoko: Evolution
- Delete, Thai Netflix eight-episode miniseries
