= Aria (1987 film) =

Anthology film by Don Boyd

- Theatrical release poster
- Directed by: Robert Altman; Bruce Beresford; Bill Bryden; Jean-Luc Godard; Derek Jarman; Franc Roddam; Nicolas Roeg; Ken Russell; Charles Sturridge; Julien Temple
- Written by: Robert Altman; Bruce Beresford; Don Boyd; Bill Bryden; Louis de Cahusac; Derek Jarman; Philippe Quinault; Franc Roddam; Nicolas Roeg; Ken Russell; Charles Sturridge; Julien Temple
- Produced by: Don Boyd
- Starring: Theresa Russell; Buck Henry; Beverly D'Angelo; John Hurt; Anita Morris; Bridget Fonda
- Cinematography: Gabriel Beristain; Caroline Champetier; Frederick Elmes; Christopher Hughes; Harvey Harrison; Pierre Mignot; Mike Southon; Dante Spinotti; Oliver Stapleton; Gale Tattersall
- Edited by: Neil Abrahamson; Robert Altman; Jennifer Augé; Marie-Thérèse Boiché; Michael Bradsell; Peter Cartwright; Angus Cook; Mike Cragg; Stephen P. Dunn; Rick Elgood; Tony Lawson; Matthew Longfellow; Paul Naisbitt
- Music by: Giuseppe Verdi; Gustave Charpentier; Giacomo Puccini; Erich Wolfgang Korngold
- Production companies: Lightyear Entertainment; Virgin Films
- Distributed by: Virgin Vision
- Release date: 15 September 1987
- Running time: 90 minutes
- Country: United Kingdom
- Languages: Italian; German; French
- Box office: $1 million

Aria is a 1987 British anthology film produced by Don Boyd that consists of ten short films by ten different filmmakers, each showing the director's choice of visual accompaniment to one or more operatic arias. There is little or no dialogue, with most words coming from the libretto of the operas in Italian, French, or German. The film was entered into the 1987 Cannes Film Festival.

== Summary ==
The opening credits are set to the prelude to Giuseppe Verdi's La traviata.

=== Un ballo in maschera ===
A fictionalised account of the visit by King Zog I of Albania to Vienna in 1931, to see a lover, when opponents tried to assassinate him on the steps of the opera house (in fact after leaving a performance of Pagliacci) but by shooting back he survived.

- Music composed by Giuseppe Verdi
- Extracts: Prelude, "Re dell' abisso", "Di che fulgor, che musiche", "La rivedrà nell'estasi", "Ebben si t'amo", "Mezza notte", "O giustizia del fato"
- Sung by Leontyne Price, Carlo Bergonzi, Robert Merrill, Shirley Verrett, Reri Grist; conducted by Erich Leinsdorf
- Directed by Nicolas Roeg
- Starring Theresa Russell, Stephanie Lane
- Running time: 14 minutes

=== "La vergine degli angeli" from La forza del destino ===
Three children in London, devoted to a statue of the Virgin Mary, steal and set fire to a luxury car, which they later watch on the TV news.

- Music composed by Giuseppe Verdi
- Sung by Leontyne Price; conducted by Thomas Schippers
- Directed by Charles Sturridge
- Starring Nicola Swain, Jackson Kyle, Marianne McLaughlin
- Running time: 5 minutes
- In the credits, this short is incorrectly spelled "La Virgine Degli Angeli" and incorrectly spells the work by Verdi in the same way.

=== Armide ===
In a gym, two young women working as cleaners are entranced by the muscles of the male bodybuilders, who maintain their concentration even when the women strip.

- Music composed by Jean-Baptiste Lully
- Extracts: "Ah! Si la liberté me doit être ravie", "Enfin, il est en ma puissance", "Venez, venez, Haine implacable"
- Libretto by Philippe Quinault
- Performed by Rachel Yakar, Zeger Vandersteene, Danielle Borst; conducted by Philippe Herreweghe
- Directed by Jean-Luc Godard
- Starring Valérie Allain, Marion Peterson
- Running time: 11 minutes

=== Rigoletto ===
A bedroom farce set in the Madonna Inn at San Luis Obispo, in which a movie producer cheats on his wife with a pneumatic German starlet while unaware that his spouse is also there in the inn with a clandestine hunk of her own. The finale is a dance routine to La donna è mobile sung by an Elvis impersonator.

- Music by Giuseppe Verdi
- Extracts: "Questa o quella", "Gualtier Maldè... caro nome", "La donna è mobile", "Addio, addio"
- Sung by Robert Merrill, Anna Moffo, Alfredo Kraus; conducted by Georg Solti
- Directed by Julien Temple
- Written by Charlie Coffey
- Starring Buck Henry, Beverly D'Angelo, Garry Kasper, Anita Morris
- Running time: 14 minutes

=== "Glück, das mir verblieb" from Die tote Stadt ===
In the seemingly dead city of Bruges in winter, footage of empty buildings in deserted streets is intercut with a duet of two lovers in an ornate bed chamber.

- Music composed by Erich Wolfgang Korngold
- Sung by Carol Neblett and René Kollo; conducted by Erich Leinsdorf
- Directed by Bruce Beresford
- Starring Elizabeth Hurley, Peter Birch
- Running time: 5 minutes

=== Abaris ou les Boréades ===
In the Théâtre Le Ranelagh in Paris in 1734, a preview of the opera is given to an audience of inmates from a mental asylum.

- Music composed by Jean-Philippe Rameau
- Libretto by Louis de Cahusac
- Extracts: Entr'acte – "Suite des vents", "Nuit redoutable! ... Lieu désolé", "Jouissons, jouissons! Jouissons de nos beaux ans"
- Performed by Jean-Philippe Lafont, Philip Langridge, John Aler; conducted by John Eliot Gardiner
- Directed by Robert Altman
- Starring Julie Hagerty, Geneviève Page, Sandrine Dumas, Chris Campion
- Running time: 7 minutes

=== "Liebestod" from Tristan und Isolde ===
Two young lovers drive down Fremont Street in Las Vegas at night and in a cheap hotel, after making love, slash their wrists in the bath.

- Music composed by Richard Wagner
- Sung by Leontyne Price; conducted by Henry Lewis
- Directed by Franc Roddam
- Starring Bridget Fonda in her first credited film role; James Mathers as her lover.
- Running time: 7 minutes

=== "Nessun dorma" from Turandot ===
Unconscious after a car crash, a lovely young woman imagines her body is being adorned with diamonds and rubies in a tribal ritual, when in fact it is the preparations for surgery. After nearly dying on the operating table, she regains consciousness.

- Music composed by Giacomo Puccini
- Sung by Jussi Björling; conducted by Erich Leinsdorf
- Directed by Ken Russell
- Starring Linzi Drew
- Running time: 7 minutes

=== "Depuis le jour" from Louise ===
A veteran opera singer gives her final performance, intercut by home movies of her on holiday when young and in love.

- Music composed by Gustave Charpentier
- Sung by Leontyne Price; conducted by Francesco Molinari-Pradelli
- Directed by Derek Jarman
- Starring Tilda Swinton, Amy Johnson, Spencer Leigh
- Running time: 6 minutes

=== "Vesti la giubba" from Pagliacci ===
In an ornate opera house, empty except for a possibly imaginary young woman, an aging virtuoso mimes his aria to an old 78 rpm recording and dies.

- Music composed by Ruggero Leoncavallo
- Sung by Enrico Caruso
- Directed by Bill Bryden
- Written by Bill Bryden and Don Boyd
- Starring John Hurt, Sophie Ward
- Running time: 4 minutes

The closing credits, after replaying a small excerpt of each of the ten operas, are again set to the overture to Giuseppe Verdi's La traviata, thus closing the cycle.

== Production ==
The film was made with part finance from Virgin Films.

== Reception ==
The film was nominated for the Palme d'Or at the Cannes Film Festival. The film that won instead was Sous le soleil de Satan.

The American writer Leonard Maltin did not seem to appreciate the work: "Godawful collection of short films, each one supposedly inspired by an operatic aria. Precious few make sense, or even seem to match the music, some are downright embarrassing. Roddam's bittersweet Las Vegas fable (set to Tristan und Isolde), Beresford's sweet and simple rendering of Erich Wolfgang Korngold's Die tote Stadt are among the better segments—relatively speaking. A pitiful waste of talent."

Giving it three stars, Roger Ebert wrote: "I am not sure that any indispensable statement about opera has been made here, and purists will no doubt recoil at the irreverence of some of the images. But the film is fun almost as a satire of itself, as a project in which the tension between the directors and their material allows them to poke a little fun at their own styles and obsessions. You could almost call Aria the first MTV version of opera."

Filmink called it "an artistically bold swing that the public didn’t really embrace but no disgrace."

== Bibliography ==
- Guerand, Jean-Philippe. In: Première (France). (MG), June 1987, p. 17.
- Godard, Jean-Luc. "Jean-Luc Godard par Jean-Luc Godard," vol. 2, 1984–1998. Cahiers du cinéma, 1998, 2866421981.
