= The Box (2003 film) =

- Directed by: Richard Pepin
- Written by: James Russo
- Produced by: James Russo
- Starring: James Russo; Theresa Russell; Brad Dourif; Steve Railsback; Jon Polito; Michael Rooker; John Snyder
- Cinematography: James M. LeGoy
- Edited by: Stephen Adrianson
- Music by: Chris Anderson
- Distributed by: MTI Home Video
- Release date: 2003
- Running time: 99 minutes
- Country: United States
- Language: English

The Box is a 2003 American film noir starring James Russo, Theresa Russell, Brad Dourif, Steve Railsback, Jon Polito, Michael Rooker, John Snyder and directed by Richard Pepin.

Russo won the Best Actor Award at the San Diego Film Festival for his role in this film in 2004.

== Plot ==
An ex-con trying to go straight meets up with a female co-worker who has attempted to start her life over after working as a prostitute.

== Sources ==
- The Box at IMDb
- http://www.shoestring.org/mmi_revs/box-ms-162814546.html
- https://www.variety.com/profiles/Film/main/165191/The%20Box.html?dataSet=1
- http://www.filmmonthly.com/Video/Articles/TheBox/TheBox.html
