= Nicolas Roeg =

English film director and cinematographer (1928–2018)

Nicolas Roeg CBE BSC
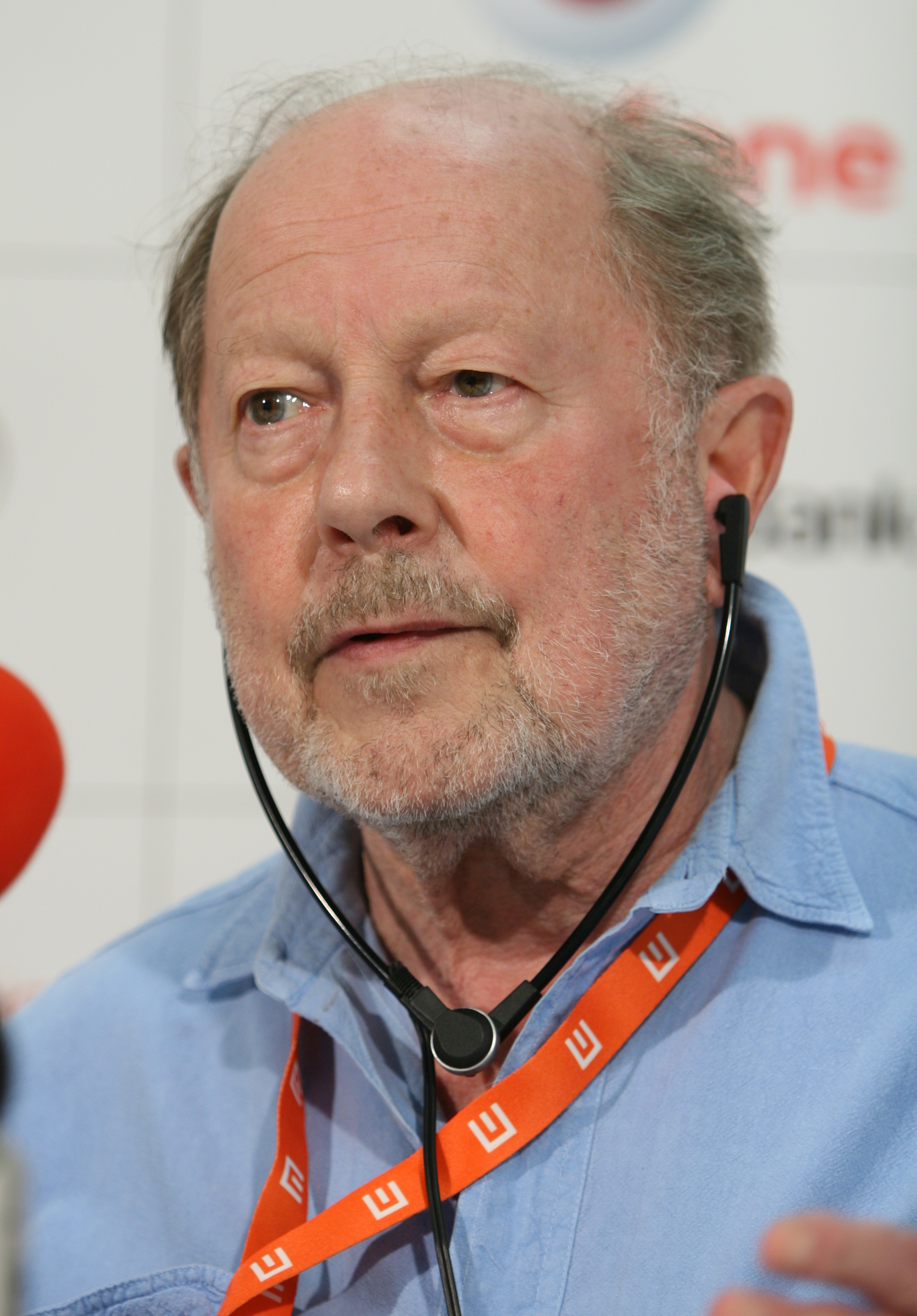
- Roeg at the 43rd Karlovy Vary International Film Festival in 2008
- Born: Nicolas Jack Roeg; 15 August 1928; St John's Wood, London, England
- Died: 23 November 2018 (aged 90); London, England
- Other name: Nicholas Jack Roeg
- Occupations: Director; cinematographer
- Years active: 1947–2013
- Spouses: Susan Stephen (m. 1957; div. 1977) Theresa Russell (m. 1982, divorced) Harriet Harper (m. 2005)
- Children: 6

Nicolas Jack Roeg (/ˈroʊɡ/ ROHG; 15 August 1928 – 23 November 2018) was an English film director and cinematographer, best known for directing Performance (1970), Walkabout (1971), Don't Look Now (1973), The Man Who Fell to Earth (1976), Bad Timing (1980) and The Witches (1990).

Making his directorial debut 23 years after his entry into the film business, Roeg quickly became known for an idiosyncratic visual and narrative style, characterised by the use of disjointed and disorienting editing. For this reason, he is considered a highly influential filmmaker, cited as an inspiration by such directors as Steven Soderbergh, Christopher Nolan and Danny Boyle.

In 1999, the British Film Institute acknowledged Roeg's importance in the British film industry by naming Don't Look Now and Performance the 8th- and 48th-greatest British films of all time in its Top 100 British films poll.

== Early life ==
Roeg was born in St John's Wood in north London on 15 August 1928 to Jack Nicolas Roeg and Mabel Gertrude (née Silk). He had an older sister, Nicolette (1925–1987), who was an actress. His father, of Dutch origin, achieved considerable success in the diamond trade, until a failed South African investment saw him suffer heavy financial losses. Of his initial attraction to the film industry, Roeg suggested it was sparked by a recording studio located opposite his home. Roeg was educated at the Mercers' School in London.

== Career ==
=== Cinematography ===
In 1947, after completing national service in the British Army as a unit projectionist, Roeg entered the film business as a tea boy, moving up to clapper-loader, the bottom rung of the camera department, at Marylebone Studios in London. For a time, he worked as a camera operator on a number of film productions, including The Sundowners and The Trials of Oscar Wilde.

Roeg was a second-unit cinematographer on David Lean's Lawrence of Arabia (1962) and this led to Lean's hiring Roeg as cinematographer on his next film, Doctor Zhivago (1965); Roeg's creative vision clashed with that of Lean and eventually he was fired from the production and replaced by Freddie Young, who received sole credit for cinematography when the film was released in 1965. He was credited as cinematographer on Roger Corman's The Masque of the Red Death and François Truffaut's Fahrenheit 451, as well as John Schlesinger's Far from the Madding Crowd and Richard Lester's Petulia; the latter is the last film on which Roeg was solely credited for cinematography and also shares many characteristics and similarities with Roeg's work as a director.

=== Directing ===
In the late 1960s, Roeg moved into directing with Performance, alongside Donald Cammell. The film centres on an aspiring London gangster (James Fox) who moves in with a reclusive rock star (Mick Jagger) to evade his bosses. The film featured cinematography by Roeg and a screenplay by Cammell, the latter of whom had favoured Marlon Brando for the James Fox role. The film was completed in 1968 but withheld from release by its distributor Warner Bros. who, according to Sanford Lieberson, "didn't think it was releasable." The film was eventually released with an X rating in 1970 and, despite its initial poor reception, has come to be held in high esteem by critics due to its cult following.

Roeg followed up with Walkabout, which tells the story of an English teenage girl and her younger brother who are abandoned in the Australian Outback by their father after his suicide and forced to fend for themselves, with the help of an Aboriginal boy on his walkabout. Roeg cast Jenny Agutter in the role of the girl, his son Luc as the boy, and David Gulpilil as the Aboriginal boy. It was widely praised by critics despite its lack of commercial success.

Roeg's next film, Don't Look Now, is based on Daphne du Maurier's short story of the same name and starred Julie Christie and Donald Sutherland as a married couple in Venice mourning the death of their daughter who had drowned. It attracted scrutiny early on due to a sex scene between Sutherland and Christie, which was unusually explicit for the time. Roeg's decision to inter-cut the sexual intercourse with shots of the couple dressing afterwards was reportedly due to the need to assuage the fears of the censors and there were rumours at the time of its release that the sex was unsimulated. The film was widely praised by critics and considered one of the most important and influential horror films ever made.

Similarly to Performance, Roeg cast musicians in leading roles for his next two films, The Man Who Fell to Earth and Bad Timing. The Man Who Fell to Earth (1976) stars David Bowie as a humanoid alien who comes to Earth to collect water for his planet, which is suffering from a drought. The film divided critics and was truncated upon its U.S. release. Despite this, it was entered into the Berlin International Film Festival where Roeg was nominated for the Golden Bear. It is today considered an important science fiction film and is one of Roeg's most celebrated films. Bad Timing was released in 1980 and stars Art Garfunkel as an American psychiatrist living in Vienna who develops a love affair with a fellow expatriate (played by Theresa Russell, to whom Roeg was later married), which culminates in the latter being rushed to hospital due to an incident the nature of which is revealed over the course of the film. At first, it was disliked by critics, as well as by the Rank Organisation, its distributor, who allegedly described it as "a sick film made by sick people for sick people." Rank requested that their logo be taken off the finished film.

Bad Timing marked the beginning of a three-film partnership with Jeremy Thomas. The second of these films Eureka (1983) is loosely based on the true story of Sir Harry Oakes; it received a largely limited release both theatrically and on home video. It was followed up with Insignificance, which imagines a meeting between Marilyn Monroe, Albert Einstein, Monroe's second husband Joe DiMaggio and Senator Joseph McCarthy. Insignificance was screened in competition at the 1985 Cannes Film Festival, with the film being selected to compete for the Palme d'Or.

In 1986, Roeg was approached by then Secretary of State for Health and Social Services Norman Fowler and the advertising agency TBWA to direct the British government's public health campaign AIDS: Don't Die of Ignorance.

Roeg's next two films, Castaway and Track 29, are considered minor entries in his oeuvre. Roeg was selected to direct an adaptation of Roald Dahl's children's novel The Witches by Jim Henson, who had procured the film rights to the book in 1983. This would prove to be his last major studio film and proved a great success with critics, although it was a box-office failure. Roeg made only three theatrical films following The Witches: Cold Heaven (1992), Two Deaths (1995) and Puffball (2007). Roeg also did a small amount of work for television, including Sweet Bird of Youth, an adaptation of the Tennessee Williams play, and Heart of Darkness and an episode of George Lucas's Young Indiana Jones.

Roeg did not make any more films after 2007, but published a memoir, The World Is Ever Changing, in 2013.

== Style and influence ==
Roeg's films are known for having scenes and images from the plot presented in a disarranged fashion, out of chronological and causal order, requiring the viewer to do the work of mentally rearranging them to comprehend the story line. They seem to "shatter reality into a thousand pieces" and are "unpredictable, fascinating, cryptic, and liable to leave you wondering what the hell just happened..." This is also the strategy of Richard Lester's 1968 film Petulia, which was Roeg's last film as a cinematographer only. A characteristic of Roeg's films is that they are edited in disjunctive and semi-coherent ways that make full sense only in the film's final moments, when a crucial piece of information surfaces; they are "mosaic-like montages [filled with] elliptical details which become very important later."

These techniques, along with Roeg's foreboding sense of atmosphere, influenced later such filmmakers as Steven Soderbergh, Tony Scott, Ridley Scott, François Ozon and Danny Boyle. In addition to this, Christopher Nolan has said his film Memento would have been "pretty unthinkable" without Roeg and cites the finale of Insignificance as an influence on his own Inception. In addition to this, Steven Soderbergh's Out of Sight features a love scene that is visibly influenced by that in Don't Look Now.

A further theme that can be seen to be running through Roeg's filmography is characters who are out of their natural setting. Examples of this include the schoolchildren in the Outback in Walkabout, the men and women in Venice in Don't Look Now, the alien on Earth in The Man Who Fell to Earth, and the Americans in Vienna in Bad Timing.

Roeg's influence on cinema is not limited to deconstructing narrative. The "Memo from Turner" sequence in Performance predates many techniques later used in music videos. The "quadrant" sequence in Bad Timing, in which the thoughts of Theresa Russell and Art Garfunkel are heard before words are spoken set to Keith Jarrett's piano music from The Köln Concert, stretched the boundaries of what could be done with film.

== Legacy and honours ==
Roeg's cinematic work was showcased at the Riverside Studios from 12–14 September 2008. He introduced the retrospective with Miranda Richardson, who starred in Puffball. The programme included Bad Timing, Far from the Madding Crowd, The Man Who Fell to Earth, The Witches, Eureka, Don't Look Now and Insignificance. The London Film Academy organised this event for Roeg in honour of his patronage of the school.

In 1994, he was awarded a British Film Institute Fellowship. In the 1996 New Year Honours, Roeg was made a Commander of the Order of the British Empire.

== Personal life and death ==
From 1957 to 1977, Roeg was married to English actress Susan Stephen. They had four sons: Waldo, Nico, Sholto and (film producer) Luc Roeg. Luc appeared as an actor, as Lucien John, in Walkabout, Roeg's first film as solo director. In 1982, Roeg married American actress Theresa Russell and they had two sons: Maximillian (an actor) and Statten Roeg. They later divorced. Roeg was then married to Harriet Harper from 2005 until his death.

Roeg died from dementia, on 23 November 2018, at a nursing home in Ladbroke Grove, London at the age of 90.

Actor Donald Sutherland (who named one of his sons after Roeg) described Roeg as a "fearless visionary". Filmmaker Duncan Jones, the son of David Bowie, who starred in The Man Who Fell to Earth (1976), also paid tribute to Roeg, calling him a "great storyteller" and "inimitable".

== Filmography ==
Roeg is credited on the following films:

=== Director ===
==== Film ====
Year	Title	Notes
1970	Performance	Co-directed with Donald Cammell
1971	Walkabout	Also writer
1973	Don't Look Now	
1976	The Man Who Fell to Earth	
1980	Bad Timing	
1983	Eureka	
1985	Insignificance	
1986	Castaway	
1988	Track 29	
1990	The Witches	
1991	Cold Heaven	
1995	Two Deaths	
2007	Puffball	

Short film

Year	Title	Notes
1967	Breakthrough	
1987	Un ballo in maschera	Segment of Aria (Also writer)
1995	Hotel Paradise	
2000	The Sound of Claudia Schiffer	
2014	The Film That Buys the Cinema	One-minute segment

Documentary film

- Glastonbury Fayre (1972) (Uncredited)

==== Television ====
TV movies

- Sweet Bird of Youth (1989)
- Heart of Darkness (1993)
- Full Body Massage (1995)

TV series

Year	Title	Notes
1993	The Young Indiana Jones Chronicles	Episode "Paris, October 1916"
1996	Samson and Delilah	Miniseries

=== Cinematographer ===
Film

Year	Title	Director	Notes
1960	Jazz Boat	Ken Hughes	With Ted Moore
1961	Information Received	Robert Lynn	
1962	Dr. Crippen	Robert Lynn	
1962	Band of Thieves	Peter Bezencenet	
1963	Just for Fun	Gordon Flemyng	
1963	The Caretaker	Clive Donner	
1964	The Masque of the Red Death	Roger Corman	
1964	Nothing But the Best	Clive Donner	
1964	Code 7, Victim 5	Robert Lynn	
1964	The System	Michael Winner	
1965	Every Day's a Holiday	James Hill	
1966	Fahrenheit 451	François Truffaut	
1966	A Funny Thing Happened on the Way to the Forum	Richard Lester	
1967	Far from the Madding Crowd	John Schlesinger	
1968	Petulia	Richard Lester	
1970	Performance	Himself; Donald Cammell	
1971	Walkabout	Himself	
1972	Glastonbury Fayre	Peter Neal	Documentary film

Television

Year	Title	Director	Notes
1961	The Pursuers	Robert Lynn	Episode "The Frame" (Location shoot)
1961	Ghost Squad	Robert Lynn	Episode "Death from a Distance"

== Accolades ==
Award/association	Year	Category	Nominated work	Result	Ref.
Berlin International Film Festival	1976	Golden Bear	The Man Who Fell to Earth	Nominated	
British Academy Film Awards	1964	Best Cinematography (Colour)	Nothing But the Best	Nominated	
British Academy Film Awards	1967	Best Cinematography (Colour)	Far from the Madding Crowd	Nominated	
British Academy Film Awards	1973	Best Direction	Don't Look Now	Nominated	
Cannes Film Festival	1971	Palme d'Or	Walkabout	Nominated	
Cannes Film Festival	1985	Technical Grand Prize	Insignificance	Won	
Cannes Film Festival	1985	Palme d'Or	Insignificance	Nominated	
Cannes Film Festival	1987	Palme d'Or	Aria	Nominated	
Chicago International Film Festival	1995	Gold Chicago Hugo	Two Deaths	Nominated	
Deauville American Film Festival	1988	Deauville Critics Award	Track 29	Nominated	
Fantasporto	1990	International Fantasy Film Award	The Witches	Nominated	
Hugo Awards	1976	Best Dramatic Presentation	The Man Who Fell to Earth	Nominated	
Hugo Awards	1990	Best Dramatic Presentation	The Witches	Nominated	
London Film Critics' Circle	1980	Director of the Year	Bad Timing	Nominated	
National Society of Film Critics	1967	Best Cinematography	Far from the Madding Crowd	3rd place	
Toronto International Film Festival	1980	People's Choice Award	Bad Timing	Nominated	
