= Impulse (1990 film) =

1990 thriller film directed by Sondra Locke

- Theatrical release poster
- Directed by: Sondra Locke
- Screenplay by: Leigh Chapman
- Story by: John DeMarco
- Produced by: Albert S. Ruddy; Andre Morgan
- Starring: Theresa Russell; Jeff Fahey; George Dzundza
- Cinematography: Dean Semler
- Edited by: John W. Wheeler
- Music by: Michel Colombier
- Distributed by: Warner Bros.
- Release date: April 6, 1990
- Running time: 109 minutes
- Country: United States
- Language: English
- Budget: $9 million
- Box office: $2.4 million

Impulse is a 1990 American neo-noir film directed by Sondra Locke, and starring Theresa Russell, Jeff Fahey, and George Dzundza. It follows a female police officer who works as an undercover prostitute in Los Angeles, who unwittingly finds herself at the center of a murder investigation. The film also features a power ballad by singer Kim Carnes called "Everybody Needs Someone".

== Plot ==
LAPD officer Lottie Mason works vice squad as a decoy prostitute. She is faced with various problems in her career, including being sexually harassed by her superior, Lieutenant Joe Morgan. However, she finds her sting operations thrilling, often fantasizing about "losing control." Stan Harris, a detective in the department, begins to romance Lottie. The two eventually go on a date together and become intimate.

After a sting operation ends with Lottie killing a drug dealer and two of his thugs, she heads home, rattled, and suffers a tire blowout en route. She pulls into a gas station to have a serviceman replace the tire and has a drink at a bar across the street while waiting. There, she is approached by mobster Tony Perón, a key witness in the pending trial of kingpin Luna; Tony fled New York City and went into hiding in Los Angeles. Unaware of his identity, Lottie coyly pretends to be a prostitute, introducing herself using the pseudonym "Carla". Tony asks Lottie to accompany him back to a mansion in Beverly Hills, to which she agrees. Excusing herself to the mansion's bathroom, Lottie comes to her senses about the seriousness of the situation and prepares to leave, only to hear gunshots ring out. She hides as a killer wanders through the home before leaving. When she returns downstairs, Lottie finds Tony's dead body. Lottie wipes away her fingerprints in the bathroom and phones 911, disguising her voice. In Tony's pocket, she finds an airport locker key and takes it with her. Police—Stan among them—later arrive at the crime scene.

Curious, Lottie drives to the airport to access the locker and is shocked to find a suitcase inside with $1 million in hundred-dollar bills. She leaves the suitcase in the locker and returns home, only to find coverage of Tony's murder on national news. Stan and other law enforcement interview witnesses at the bar who saw Tony leave with Lottie, and a forensic sketch is created. Lottie returns to the airport and absconds with the suitcase, which she hides in her apartment, unsure of what to do with it.

Lottie visits Stan and spends the night at his house, during which the two have sex. In the morning, Lottie attempts to confess to him what happened, but is unable to. While studying the sketch and 911 audio tapes, Stan begins to suspect Lottie may be "Carla". That night, he returns home drunk and confronts Lottie, believing that she killed Tony. Lottie explains what occurred, but Stan remains feeling angry and betrayed. The next day, Stan visits the district attorney with a plan to set up Tony's killer: As part of the plot, a local newscaster announces a false "new development" in the case, parading footage of a sunglasses-clad Lottie, who proclaims that she can identify the killer.

That night, Lottie stakes out in an abandoned house, waiting for the killer. A stranger arrives, but leaves when police close in. They eventually stop the man, who claims he is innocent and was paid $50 by someone to deliver Lottie flowers. Stan and the other detectives rush back to the house, where the killer has descended upon the scene, murdering the surveilling officer outside. When the killer—revealed to be a man named Vic Dimarjian—enters the house, Lottie shoots him to death. Before dying, Vic admits he killed Tony to prevent himself from having to testify against Luna.

Lottie resigns from the LAPD and decides to take a vacation. Morgan, suspicious that Lottie has Tony's missing money from a drug killing in New York, is abrasive to her as she leaves the department. He follows her to the airport and confronts her as she opens the airport locker. Forcing her into a bathroom, Morgan grows enraged after finding the suitcase full of baseball cards. Stan later arrives and incapacitates Morgan before giving Lottie the keys to his car, where he reveals he has stored Tony's money in the trunk. Lottie goes to retrieve the cash but decides against it. She returns inside to the airport bar, where she insists that Stan turn it in to authorities before joining him for a drink.

== Cast ==
- Theresa Russell as Lottie Mason
- Jeff Fahey as Stan Harris
- George Dzundza as Lieutenant Joe Morgan
- Alan Rosenberg as Charley Katz
- Nicholas Mele as Rossi
- Eli Danker as Vic Dimarjian
- Charles McCaughan as Frank Munoff
- Lynne Thigpen as Dr. Gardner
- Shawn Elliott as Tony Perón
- Angelo Tiffe as Luke
- Christopher Lawford as Steve
- Daniel Quinn as Ted Gates

== Release ==
=== Critical response ===
On the review aggregator website Rotten Tomatoes, 33% of nine critics' reviews are positive, with an average rating of 4.6/10.

Caryn James of The New York Times called the film "amazingly pedestrian," concluding that, "after a harrowing failed drug buy, Lottie does lose control and steps into the role she has been playing. But instead of using that psychological twist to create something resembling a character, Impulse treats it as another piece in the jerry-built plot."

The Los Angeles Times's Michael Wilmington gave the film a middling review, though he conceded: "[it is] frosty-cool on top and hot underneath, full of sleek surfaces and nervous undercurrents. At times it succeeds. Director Sondra Locke uses a clean, uncluttered style. She doesn’t get swept away in action-movie froufrou and preposterous plot twists the way Kathryn Bigelow did in that other tough-lady-in-distress thriller, Blue Steel."

Roger Ebert championed the film, praising Russell's performance and Locke's direction, comparing it to Robert Bresson's Pickpocket (1959).

=== Home media ===
The film was not a success at the box office, though it performed better on home video when released in the fall of 1990. In January 2013, the film was released on DVD-R by the Warner Archive Collection.

== Sources ==
- Silver, Alain; Ursini, James, eds. (1999). Film Noir Reader 2. New York: Limelight Editions. ISBN 978-0-879-10280-7.
