= Whore (1991 film) =

1991 film by Ken Russell

- Theatrical release poster.
- Directed by: Ken Russell
- Screenplay by: Ken Russell; Deborah Dalton
- Based on: Bondage by David Hines
- Produced by: Dan Ireland; Ronaldo Vasconcellos
- Starring: Theresa Russell; Benjamin Mouton
- Cinematography: Amir Mokri
- Edited by: Brian Tagg
- Music by: Michael Gibbs
- Production company: Cheap Date
- Distributed by: Trimark Pictures
- Release dates: January 24, 1991 (Sundance); October 4, 1991 (United States)
- Running time: 85 minutes
- Country: United States
- Language: English
- Budget: <$2 million–$4 million
- Box office: $1 million

Whore is a 1991 American satirical drama/erotic thriller film directed by Ken Russell and starring Theresa Russell. It follows the life of a jaded street prostitute in Los Angeles. Benjamin Mouton, Antonio Fargas, Jack Nance, Danny Trejo, and Ginger Lynn Allen appear in supporting roles. The screenplay by Russell and Deborah Dalton is based on David Hines's monologue play, Bondage. The film is partly presented in a pseudo-documentary format, with the lead character often breaking the fourth wall and addressing the audience with monologues consisting of her observations and reflections on her career as a prostitute.

While the source play, Bondage, was set in London, Ken Russell was unable to find funding for the film in Britain due to its frank language and sexual content, leading him to instead make the film in the United States and change its setting to Los Angeles. The film was shot in a fortnight in downtown Los Angeles in September 1990.

Whore premiered at the Sundance Film Festival in January 1991, followed by theatrical releases in the United Kingdom and the United States in June 1991 and October 1991, respectively. While not a financial success, grossing a little over $1 million, the film did attract some positive notices from critics, particularly for Theresa Russell's performance. The film was given an NC-17 rating in the United States, and was banned in Ireland due to its depiction of sexuality and violence.

== Plot ==
Liz is a Los Angeles street prostitute who is first seen attempting to get a customer on a busy downtown street near a tunnel. She addresses the audience directly on her life and problems throughout the film. One man stops and demands anal sex, and she crassly declines him. When a van stops by, she also brushes the driver off, recalling the last time she serviced a man in a van: It turned out there were several other men inside who gang-raped her, beat her, and left her for dead. An elderly man passing by gave her his handkerchief and offered to take her to a hospital. She refused, instead asking the older man for money. Later, Liz sends him the money back with a thank-you note and a new handkerchief.

Weary of her life as a prostitute, Liz is also attempting to escape her pimp, Blake, a well-dressed, businesslike and extremely controlling man. As Liz stops at a strip club for a drink, she explains how she ended up as she did: She was a small-town girl who married a violent drunk named Bill. Though they had a son together, Liz could no longer cope with his alcoholism and abuse, so she left with their infant child. Liz took a nightly shift at a diner and lived in poverty until one night, a customer offered her money to have sex with him. Desperate for money, Liz agreed and began prostituting herself independently for a time until meeting Blake, who takes her to Los Angeles. Though Blake does do some things for her (including getting her tattooed), he is ultimately as cruel as her husband.

While working the street downtown, Liz finds a fellow prostitute who has just been viciously stabbed in the stomach by a john. Liz brings the woman into a movie theater bathroom and attempts to stop her bleeding wound. She is helped by a patron in the theater, Katie, with whom Liz becomes good friends. Katie is an intellectual, and loans Liz the novel Animal Farm, the first book Liz has ever finished reading. The women's friendship, however, ends after Blake intimidates Liz and accuses Katie of being a lesbian.

A homeless street performer named Rasta decides to treat Liz to a film. Though Rasta initially frightens Liz (his act involves walking on broken glass), Liz agrees. At this point, the scenes of Liz and Rasta at the film are intercut with Blake explaining his life to the audience, giving the impression that Liz and Rasta are watching Blake's soliloquy. Liz recounts some of her prostitution stories, including her encounter with a male client with a shoe fetish who demanded that Liz merely insult him while he masturbated with her stiletto in his mouth.

After the film, Liz addresses the audience about her son, whom she clearly loves, though he is now in foster care. Later that night, Liz secures an elderly dapper client, who brings her to a parking garage in his vintage car. While the two have sex, the man suffers a heart attack, and Liz panics, trying to give him mouth-to-mouth resuscitation, without success. Blake happens along then. He takes Liz's money and tries to rob the dead customer before getting into a physical altercation with Liz, breaking one of her fingers. When Liz tries to stop him, Blake tries to strangle Liz and threatens to force her son into gay prostitution, with Liz retorting, "I'll kill you first!" Rasta comes to the rescue, killing Blake by slitting his throat. Liz thanks Rasta for the film and walks away.

== Cast ==
- Theresa Russell as Liz
- Benjamin Mouton as Blake
- Antonio Fargas as Rasta
- Jack Nance as man who helps Liz
- Elizabeth Morehead as Katie
- Daniel Quinn as brutal man
- Jason Saucier as Bill
- Jered Barclay as dead trick in car
- Ginger Lynn Allen as wounded girl
- Tom Villard as hippie
- Stephanie Blake as stripper in Big T's
- John Diehl as derelict
- Daniel Trejo as tattoo artist
- Ken Russell as a waiter (uncredited)

== Production ==
=== Development ===
The original play Bondage, on which the film was based, was written by a London taxi driver David Hines, who based it on a conversation with a local prostitute he drove. The play was originally performed at the Edinburgh Fringe Festival. Director Ken Russell recounted the film's genesis: "One day in London, Hines literally jumped out of his cab and stopped me in the street, to ask if I would write the screenplay; and make it into a film. I read the play and agreed to have a go."

After a number of British film financiers turned down supporting the project due to its "frank language", Russell sought to finance the film in the United States, and changed the setting from London to Los Angeles. "No one in England wanted to know. So I had to go to America for the lolly", he said. "Now she's a Hollywood hooker on Sunset Boulevard. So why couldn't I get financed in the UK? The budget was low, the potential high, the risk minimal. Perhaps the subject was considered too sleazy for export. Maybe it could never have been shown on TV. Maybe my face doesn't fit in with the film establishment here."

=== Casting ===
Ken Russell sought actress Theresa Russell to portray the lead role of Liz, but she initially turned the role down, fearing the material was too explicit. She ultimately had second thoughts, recalling: "I just couldn't stop thinking about it. I told Ken, 'I don't know how in the hell you're going to do this. I'm not interested in doing soft-core porn.' I was leery about doing it at this point in my career. I wasn't interested if it was going to be in the Crimes of Passion vein." When director Russell assured her that he was intending to incorporate campy humor into the film, she agreed to take the role, as she felt drawn to his "particular brand of madness."

=== Filming ===
Principal photography began in Los Angeles on September 4, 1990, and was completed on September 23. Sources vary regarding its production budget, with some stating as high as $4 million, and others stating less than $2 million. Presumably to save on crew expenses, Ken Russell is listed as camera operator in production credits (under the name Alf).

According to actresses Theresa Russell and Ginger Lynn Allen, director Ken Russell openly drank throughout filming, and was often drunk while shooting the film.

== Release ==
Whore had its world premiere at the Sundance Film Festival on January 24, 1991, with Theresa Russell making a live appearance to introduce the film. It subsequently screened at the Berlin International Film Festival in February 1991. The film opened in London on July 19, 1991. Trimark Pictures gave Whore a limited theatrical release in the United States on October 4, 1991, on 52 screens.

=== Censorship ===
Whore was given an NC-17 rating by the Motion Picture Association of America (MPAA) in the United States. Its distributor, Trimark Pictures, appealed the MPAA's ruling, but the rating was ultimately upheld, and the film was released under the NC-17 rating.

In the Republic of Ireland, the film was banned on August 9, 1991. The decision was upheld by the Films Appeal Board on September 20, although an earlier appeal meeting held on August 28 failed to come to a decision. This postponed the Irish home release as well, due on the week of the failed appeal with 2,000 copies. The video distributor (National Cable Vision) submitted a tape to Sheamus Smith, who headed the Irish Film Censor Board at the time, for a reconsideration on home media – no evidence exists of whether or not this was successful.

=== Home media ===
In January 1992, Vidmark Entertainment released Whore on VHS, made available in four different editions: An NC-17 version; an R-rated version; an unrated version with material not show in theaters; and a re-titled R-rated version bearing the title If You Can't Say It, Just See It, the latter of which was intended to assist video stores and retailers who may not wish to display the film's actual title. Furthermore, Vidmark packaged the VHS editions of the film with a public service announcement and toll-free number for Children of the Night, a non-profit organization helping troubled teenagers escape prostitution. A portion of the video sales for the film went to support Children of the Night. Whore was the third feature film to receive home video distribution through Vidmark Entertainment.

On August 5, 2022, Australian label Imprint Films released Whore for the first time on Blu-ray in a limited edition, featuring new interviews with actresses Theresa Russell and Ginger Lynn, writer Deborah Dalton, and filmmaker Bruce LaBruce.

In November 2022, Kino Lorber announced via their official Facebook page that they would be releasing a Blu-ray edition as well in the United States at an unspecified date. On November 15, 2024, Kino announced via their official Twitter page that the Blu-ray would be released as part of their KinoCult line on January 14, 2025, though its release was pushed back to February 4 of the same year.

This movie has been since then currently owned by Vantage Media International (via VMI Worldwide), with current distribution handled by Lionsgate in the United States.

== Reception ==
=== Box office ===
During its opening weekend in the United States, the film earned $165,543 on 52 screens. The film's theatrical release expanded wide on October 18, 1991. The film went on to gross $1,008,404 domestically.

=== Critical response ===
Whore received mixed reviews from critics. On the review aggregator website Rotten Tomatoes, 38% of 13 critics' reviews are positive, with an average rating of 4.9/10.

Roger Ebert praised Russell's performance, and gave the film a three out of four-star rating. The Los Angeles Times's Kenneth Turan alternately criticized Russell's performance as "game but dismal", and summarized the film as a "heroically tedious motion picture... The worst thing about Whore, however, is not how feeble it is, for bad films come and very quickly go, but the pathetically venal way in which its creators have exploited the problem of prostitution and its glorification in the media."

Owen Gleiberman of Entertainment Weekly awarded the film a D-rating, writing: "Despite the come-on of its title, Whore isn't a raw, tabloid exposé of life as a working girl. It is, rather, a garishly antierotic cartoon, a movie so saturated in contempt that not a moment in it feels spontaneous or true... Whore is a sad spectacle indeed." Hal Hinson of The Washington Post echoed a similar sentiment, writing: "The whole affair has a kind of dinner theater air to it. It's hopelessly amateurish and banal. Russell, who put on a few pounds for the role, has a few high-camp comic moments, but it's often hard to tell if she's intentionally bad or just plain blowing it. There's little confusion about the film as a whole, though—it's flat-out awful." Variety similarly felt Russell's performance was uneven, noting that the film's "overriding problem is a pervasive feeling of utter inauthenticity. Russell's strident, stops-out performance sets the tone for the entire picture. She's all over the place, occasionally hitting a responsive note but more often flailing about."

The Chicago Tribune's Mark Caro lambasted the film for its lack of thematic focus, noting that it "purports to be a truthful, uncompromised view of a prostitute's life, but it takes only a minute to establish that these "realities" have more to do with the British director's loony-bin worldview than America's gritty streets." He also felt that Ken Russell "eschews plot for a faux documentary style, with much of the film consisting of Liz... simply speaking to the camera. This approach might seem academic if the observations were not so unenlightening." Empire magazine's Lola Borg awarded the film one out of five stars, conceding that Theresa Russell "is obviously doing her level best to bring something—anything—to such a hollow character", but summarized: "Whore is a film almost entirely bereft of merit. Subtlety has never been Ken Russell's strongest suit but even by his own over-the-top standards, Whore lays on the sleaze and tiresome moralising with a trowel."

== Sequel ==
An unrelated direct-to-video sequel, Whore II, was released three years later in 1994, written and directed by Amos Kollek. Coincidentally, a clip from Kollek's earlier film, High Stakes, is seen in Whore.
