= Black Widow (1987 film) =

1987 film by Bob Rafelson

- Theatrical release poster
- Directed by: Bob Rafelson
- Written by: Ronald Bass
- Produced by: Laurence Mark; Harold Schneider
- Starring: Debra Winger; Theresa Russell; Sami Frey; Dennis Hopper; Nicol Williamson
- Cinematography: Conrad L. Hall
- Edited by: John Bloom
- Music by: Michael Small
- Production company: Laurence Mark Productions
- Distributed by: 20th Century Fox
- Release date: February 6, 1987
- Running time: 102 minutes
- Country: United States
- Language: English
- Budget: $10.5 million
- Box office: $221.1 million

Black Widow is a 1987 American neo-noir psychological thriller film directed by Bob Rafelson, written by Ronald Bass, and starring Debra Winger, Theresa Russell, Sami Frey, and Nicol Williamson. The plot focuses on two women: one, a serial killer who murders wealthy men whom she has married for their money (and keeps moving west), and the other a data analyst with the Department of Justice who grows obsessed with bringing her to justice. The film features Dennis Hopper, Terry O'Quinn, Lois Smith, D. W. Moffett, Diane Ladd, James Hong, and David Mamet in supporting roles.

Production of Black Widow took place in 1986, with filming occurring in Seattle, Dallas, New York City, Washington, D.C., and Hawaii. 20th Century Fox released the film on February 6, 1987. It was a box office hit, grossing over $221 million, though it received mixed reviews from film critics. Some contemporary assessment of the film has noted its stylistic similarities and references to the film noir and crime thrillers of the 1940s.

== Plot ==
U.S. Justice Department data analyst Alexandra Barnes grows suspicious of the deaths by respiratory failure of several seemingly healthy wealthy men due to a rare condition called Ondine's curse, each married within months to younger wives. Comparing photographs, Alexandra determines the wives are the same woman, wearing different hair colors and styling to look older as a disguise.

One victim is Manhattan publishing magnate Sam Peterson, whose younger wife of six months, "Catharine" (her true name is never disclosed), inherits his estate. Next, Catharine relocates to Dallas, Texas, affecting a Southern accent and posing as "Marielle". Seducing and marrying toy company owner Ben Dumers, she subsequently poisons a bottle of expensive liquor, which kills him while "Marielle" is on a trip away from home. After Ben's death, his sister, Etta, unsuccessfully attempts to contest his will, but is silenced by Catharine's gift of $500,000.

Next, Catharine moves to Seattle. After extensive research, presenting herself as an anthropologist named "Margaret," she buys her way onto the board of directors of a local historical museum. "Margaret" dazzles wealthy curator William McCrory, who has a convenient allergy to penicillin, resulting in a whirlwind romance and marriage.

Tracking Catharine's victims, Alexandra interviews their families and associates, ultimately locating Catharine in Seattle. Presenting her research to her skeptical superior, Bruce, Alexandra persuades him to send her to Seattle to investigate. Posing as a freelance reporter writing a story on powerful women, Alexandra interviews William, who tells her that his wife is private and will likely decline an interview. Meanwhile, Catharine obtains a prescription for penicillin, which she mixes into William's toothpaste, triggering a fatal heart attack. William's autopsy shows nothing unusual. Alexandra is dismayed but trails Catharine, whom she has not yet met, to Hawaii.

On Hawaii's Big Island, Catharine (now "Rennie Walker") seduces French hotelier Paul Nuytten. Posing as "Jessica Bates," Alexandra enrolls in a scuba diving class Catharine is taking, and the two partner during lessons and become friendly. Catharine grows suspicious on observing a meeting between Alexandra and a private detective, Mr. Shin. Contacting family and associates of previous victims in her pose as "widow," Catharine learns of Alexandra's interviews several months prior.

During a diving excursion several days later, Catharine saves Alexandra when her scuba gear malfunctions. Catharine confides in Alexandra that she amassed her wealth from marrying rich men and encourages Alexandra to pursue Paul. While Alexandra and Paul spend an afternoon alone, Catharine breaks into Alexandra's apartment and hires Shin to stalk her. Shin takes photos of Alexandra and Paul kissing. Though Catharine pretends to be upset, a short time later, Paul and Catharine are married.

At "Rennie" and Paul's wedding, Alexandra accuses Catharine of manipulating her and gifts Catharine a black widow spider brooch. Catharine responds by quickly kissing Alexandra on the lips and abruptly departing. Later, Catharine visits Shin, forcing him at gunpoint to administer himself a lethal overdose of heroin. Police find the photos of Paul and Alexandra in Shin's office. When Catharine goes on a trip to San Francisco—her modus operandi when poisoning— Alexandra warns Paul, revealing her investigation against Catharine. A skeptical Paul informs Alexandra that "Rennie," who is independently wealthy, insisted they both amend their wills leaving their entire estates to a cancer charity. At the subsequent notice of Paul's death, police arrest Alexandra, having found poison that Catharine had planted in Alexandra's apartment, and attributing to her a motive of jealousy on being spurned.

Under Florida law, Paul's bequest to charity can be invalidated by his wife within six months. A triumphant Catharine visits Alexandra in jail. Moments later, Paul appears, having faked his death to entrap Catharine. Believing the poison may have not been detected, Catharine warns Alexandra that she injected poison in the liquor bottle, revealing her concern that Alexandra not die accidentally. Alexandra informs her that they found the poison, and Catharine is arrested.

== Cast ==
- Debra Winger as Alexandra / Jessie
- Theresa Russell as Catharine / Rennie / Margaret / Marielle
- Sami Frey as Paul Nuytten
- Dennis Hopper as Ben Dumers
- Nicol Williamson as William McCrory
- Terry O'Quinn as Bruce
- Lois Smith as Sara
- D. W. Moffett as Michael
- Leo Rossi as Ricci, Seattle Police Detective
- Mary Woronov as Shelley
- Rutanya Alda as Irene
- James Hong as Shin
- Diane Ladd as Etta
- Wayne Heffley as Etta's husband
- David Mamet as Herb
- Raleigh Bond as Martin
- Christian Clemenson as Artie
- Arsenio Trinidad as Tran
- Thomas Hill as Attorney
- Anne Lockhart as Assistant DA
- Brian Haley as Seattle cop

== Production ==
=== Development ===
Black Widow was director Bob Rafelson's first feature film in six years. Rafelson had previously been fired from directing Brubaker (1980) after physically assaulting a studio executive during an argument in the film's early production stages. "The Brubaker episode was the most painful experience of my life," said Rafelson. "But apparently the Hollywood power structure has turned over enough times that my past misdeeds have been forgotten... Black Widow is the first time I've managed to complete a film with a major studio and I attribute that to my change in attitude. I've had a few painful experiences in my life and at a certain point I decided to receive them as lessons rather than thinking of them as obstacles."

=== Casting ===
Meryl Streep was originally sought by Rafelson for the lead role of serial killer Catharine, though Theresa Russell was ultimately cast in the part, with Rafelson and Russell being mutual admirers of each other. Rafelson commented: "I've never worked with a more dedicated and cooperative actress. Theresa has an extraordinarily open and strong aesthetic, but at the same time she's one of the least complicated women I know. There are hundreds of performers who can't talk unless one of their ears has been torn off, but Theresa comes from a completely different place—and that's pretty amazing for such a young woman."

Debra Winger was cast opposite Russell as Alexandra Barnes, the U.S. Department of Justice agent tracking her suspected killing spree. In a 1986 interview, Russell said of working with Rafelson and Winger: "His [Rafelson's] style on the set is to encourage everyone to contribute ideas, yet he remains very much in control. As far as my relationship with Debra, we're both strongly opinionated people and both share the attitude of 'Why don't you have a mind of your own and think my way?' That can make for a creative situation or you can end up hating each other. Luckily, it worked between us and we became friends."

=== Filming ===
Principal photography of Black Widow began on April 28, 1986, and was completed on July 15, 1986. Filming took place on location in the various cities and locations in which the film is set: Seattle, Dallas, Washington, D.C., New York City, and Hawaii. In Seattle, some filming took place on the University of Washington campus at the Burke Museum of Natural History and Culture. The Hawaii filming occurred on the Big Island at the Mauna Lani Resort and Kalapana, as well as at the base of the Kilauea volcano.

== Release ==
Black Widow was theatrically released in the United States on February 6, 1987.

=== Home media ===
20th Century Fox Home Entertainment released Black Widow on VHS in 1987. 20th Century Fox later released a DVD edition on February 3, 2004. Twilight Time released a limited edition Blu-ray on October 13, 2015.

== Reception ==
=== Box office ===
Black Widow opened at number four at the United States box office after Light of Day, Outrageous Fortune, and Platoon. It grossed $3.4 million during its opening weekend on 735 screens, averaging $4,662 per screen. The film went on to become a box office success, grossing a total of $25.2 million.

=== Critical response ===
On the review aggregator website Rotten Tomatoes, 58% of 24 critics' reviews are positive. Metacritic, which uses a weighted average, assigned the film a score of 70 out of 100, based on 15 critics, indicating "generally favorable" reviews. Audiences polled by CinemaScore gave the film an average grade of "B−" on an A+ to F scale.

Vincent Canby of The New York Times wrote that while the film promises more than it can deliver, its classy looks make it both soothing and "redeemingly funny, in part, at least, for not becoming mired in its own darker possibilities." He praises Winger for "the gift of seeming always to have hidden reserves of feeling that might erupt in chaos at any minute," while Russell "comes into her own" in the film, and has "a clear-eyed sweetness that adds unexpected dimension to the homicidal Catharine." Film4 notes that Black Widow succeeds through Rafelson's "menacing direction" and Debra Winger's "convincing struggle with temptation," while Theresa Russell "steals the show as the sexily assured devil sitting on her tracker's shoulder."

The Los Angeles Times's Sheila Benson had a mixed response to the film, writing that it has "a water-skeeter of a screenplay: venturing out into deep water but never really breaking the surface tension, never quite risking enough. You can be absorbed by Black Widow, fascinated and intrigued by it--and you can capitulate entirely while watching the seductive interplay of these two actresses—but Black Widow never really gets you by the throat. It's sleek where it should be dangerous." Roger Ebert similarly gave the film a mixed rating of 2.5 out of 4 stars, praising the performances by the main actors yet lamenting that "The movie makes no effort to keep us in suspense," by revealing too much early on about Russell's character.

== Television adaptation ==
In March 2025, the series that is loosely inspired by the movie was ordered by Hulu from Elizabeth Meriwether starring Emmy Rossum. Meriwether executive produces alongside Rossum, Sara Moskowitz and Ron Bass who wrote the film. In June 2025, Lola Petticrew and Scoot McNairy joined the series as series regulars. In July 2025, Quincy Tyler Bernstine was cast as a series regular. In October 2025, it was reported that Jake Lacy was cast as a series regular. It was also announced that the series was officially titled as Furious. The series premiered on July 27, 2026, with three episodes followed by one new episode weekly through August 31.

== See also ==
- Black Widow (2007 film)

== Sources ==
- Silver, Alain; Ward, Elizabeth, eds. (1992). Film Noir: An Encyclopedic Reference to the American Style (Third ed.). Woodstock, New York: The Overlook Press. ISBN 0-87951-479-5.
