= Luckytown =

2000 film

- Directed by: Paul Nicolas
- Written by: Brendan Beseth
- Produced by: Paul Nicolas
- Starring: Kirsten Dunst; Vincent Kartheiser; Luis Guzmán; James Caan
- Cinematography: Denis Maloney
- Edited by: Roberto Silvi
- Music by: Greg Edmonson
- Production companies: A Plus Entertainment; Entertainment 7; Mediapix
- Distributed by: A Plus Entertainment (U.S.); Entertainment 7 (outside U.S.)
- Release date: August 4, 2000 (Hollywood Film Festival)
- Country: United States
- Language: English

Luckytown is a 2000 film starring Kirsten Dunst, Vincent Kartheiser, Luis Guzmán, and James Caan. The film was written by Brendan Beseth, and produced and directed by Paul Nicolas.

== Plot ==
When she turns 18, unhappy Lidda Daniels leaves Southern California to look for Charlie, her father, a professional gambler who abandoned her years before. On her way to Las Vegas, she picks up Colonel, a video store clerk who she finds attractive even though they have never spoken.

== Cast ==
- Kirsten Dunst as Lidda
- Vincent Kartheiser as Colonel
- Luis Guzmán as Jimmy
- James Caan as Charlie
- Robert Miano as Tony DeCarlo
- Jennifer Gareis as Sugar
- Federico Dordei as Frankie
- Theresa Russell as Stella
- Joe Kucan as Hector

== Filming ==
A five-week shoot in Las Vegas began on December 13, 1999. Paul Nicolas, the film's director and producer, said, "We could have shot most of it in L.A., but just by being here, you get a lot of ideas. Just by driving around, you can see what Las Vegas has to offer." Nicolas said about the Las Vegas Strip and downtown Las Vegas: "seeing the sights, we're trying to write little scenes to incorporate them in the story." Approximately 14 local actors, as well as 500 local extras, appeared in the film.

During the first week of filming, scenes were shot at the Bourbon Street and Showboat hotel-casinos. For the second week, filming moved to a soundstage at Lear Entertainment's new production facility, which was also located in Las Vegas and was still under construction during filming. Scenes were to be shot on 3,600- and 8,100-square-foot stages at the facility. During the second week of filming, scenes were also shot at the Olympic Gardens strip club, and at Geebee's Bar and Grill, located south of the Las Vegas Strip.

In the third week, filming moved to the closed Rockabilly's Saloon and Dance Hall on Boulder Highway. For the film, the structure was renovated as a strip club, known in the film as Tony's Dollhouse, and was reportedly planned to be reopened as a strip club in reality after filming was scheduled to complete there. Nicolas said "we got inspired by the strip clubs in Vegas -- and we built one." Approximately one third of the film was set at Tony's Dollhouse. James Caan, who had previously played a Las Vegas gambler in The Gambler and Honeymoon in Vegas, finished filming his scenes in December 1999. After a brief New Year's break, filming resumed at Rockabilly's Saloon on January 3, 2000.

Later that month, scenes were shot at the Roadhouse Casino and McCarran International Airport, with additional scenes shot at the Bourbon Street hotel-casino. Filming was scheduled to conclude on January 13, 2000, but was extended and expected to conclude the following week. Final filming locations included the Candlelight Wedding Chapel, the Showboat hotel-casino, the Glass Pool Inn, and driving shots of the Las Vegas Strip. Production was also expected to return to Geebee's Bar and Grill for pick-up footage.

== Release ==
Luckytown premiered at the Hollywood Film Festival on August 4, 2000. In the United States, Luckytown was released on home video on July 17, 2001.

== See also ==
- List of films set in Las Vegas
