= Straight Time =

1978 American crime film

- Theatrical release poster
- Directed by: Ulu Grosbard
- Screenplay by: Alvin Sargent; Edward Bunker; Jeffrey Boam
- Based on: No Beast So Fierce by Edward Bunker
- Produced by: Stanley Beck; Tim Zinnemann
- Starring: Dustin Hoffman; Harry Dean Stanton; Gary Busey
- Cinematography: Owen Roizman
- Edited by: Sam O'Steen; Randy Roberts
- Music by: David Shire
- Production company: First Artists
- Distributed by: Warner Bros.
- Release date: March 17, 1978
- Running time: 114 minutes
- Country: United States
- Language: English
- Budget: $3.5 million–$4 million
- Box office: $9.9 million

Straight Time is a 1978 American neo-noir crime drama film directed by Ulu Grosbard and starring Dustin Hoffman, Theresa Russell, Gary Busey, Harry Dean Stanton, M. Emmet Walsh, and Kathy Bates. Its plot follows a lifelong thief in Los Angeles who struggles to assimilate in society after serving a six-year prison sentence. The film is based on the novel No Beast So Fierce by Edward Bunker, who also acts in the film.

In addition to starring, Hoffman was originally hired as the film's director, but was replaced by Grosbard after completing a day of shooting. Principal photography took place in California in 1977, with shooting occurring in Los Angeles, Sacramento, and several locations in the Inland Empire.

Warner Bros. released Straight Time on March 17, 1978. The film grossed $10 million at the United States box office, and received largely favorable reviews. In 2003, The New York Times placed the film on its Best 1,000 Movies Ever Made list.

== Plot ==
Convict Max Dembo, a career criminal, is released from prison after six years and returns home to Los Angeles, where he reports to parole officer Earl Frank. Although Max failed, as required, to go to a halfway house on arriving in the city, Earl agrees to his renting his own place provided that he also finds a job.

Max finds a cheap room and then goes to an employment agency, where a counsellor, Jenny Mercer, finds him work at a can factory. Flirting with Jenny, Max invites her to dinner, which she accepts. While they eat, he tells her about prison life.

Max is concerned when his friend Willy Darin heats up some heroin in his room, as that could lead to his being returned to prison for another three years. Earl visits Max's room, as he warned him he would do, and finds evidence of Willy's drug use. Although Max has no track marks or other signs of drug abuse, Earl handcuffs him and he is taken to the Los Angeles County Jail for drug tests. Jenny visits him there and gives him her number to call when he gets out.

After urine tests prove Max is clean, Earl picks him up and, while driving him to a halfway house where he is to stay, presses him to name the user. Angry at how Earl has treated him, Max attacks him, takes control of his car, and handcuffs him to a highway divider fence with his pants around his ankles before driving away.

Max is now forced to return to a life of crime. He begins by robbing a convenience store on his own. Jenny, with whom he now begins a relationship, lends him her car to help him out, although she tells him what he is doing scares her. Max recruits an old friend, Jerry Schue, to help him hold up a high-stakes poker game, but another friend who is supposed to provide them with guns fails to do so. Max then breaks in to a pawn shop at night and steals some guns, which he and Jerry use to rob a bank.

Max cases a Beverly Hills jewelry store using Jenny as a decoy. He and Jerry then return to hold up the store with Willy as their getaway driver. When Max takes too long trying to steal everything in sight, Willy panics and takes off, leaving Max and Jerry to flee on foot as police converge on the store. Jerry is shot and killed climbing over a fence, and Max shoots the police officer who killed Jerry. Max escapes, goes to Willy's house to kill him, and flees Los Angeles with Jenny in her car. On the way, they hear a news bulletin on the radio about the holdup; Jenny learns about Jerry being killed and the officer being shot, after which she becomes upset and forces Max to stop the car so she can get out and vomit on the side of the road.

A short time later, at a diner, Max decides to have Jenny return to Los Angeles by bus. He slips money and a valuable stolen watch in her handbag and leaves in her car; she reluctantly watches him go.

== Cast ==
- Dustin Hoffman as Max Dembo
- Theresa Russell as Jenny Mercer
- Gary Busey as Willy Darin
- Harry Dean Stanton as Jerry Schue
- M. Emmet Walsh as Earl Frank
- Rita Taggart as Carol Schue
- Kathy Bates as Selma Darin
- Sandy Baron as Manny
- Jake Busey as Henry Darin
- Tina Menard as Hotel Manager

== Production ==
=== Development ===
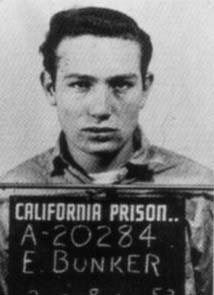
The screenplay was adapted from the novel No Beast So Fierce by Edward Bunker (pictured)

The screenplay was written by Alvin Sargent, Edward Bunker and Jeffrey Boam, based on Bunker's novel No Beast So Fierce. Michael Mann served as an uncredited cowriter on the project. Actor Dustin Hoffman originally wanted to direct the project himself. According to Grosbard, he was called to take over directorial duties by Hoffman: "He'd already spent a substantial amount of the budget—and it was a small budget. He had stopped preproduction because he was waiting for the latest draft of the script... I saw a direction, I saw a point of view, I saw something that interested me."

=== Casting ===
Hoffman plays the lead role in the film, with supporting performances from Theresa Russell, as well as Gary Busey, Harry Dean Stanton, and Kathy Bates. Russell was around 17 years old when she was cast in the film. Grosbard cast Russell in the film because he felt she was "very right for the part" and had a personal background similar to that of her character. Additionally, Grosbard commented that she had a "good rapport" with Hoffman. In preparation for his role as a criminal, Stanton spent time sitting isolated in a gas chamber.

=== Pre-production ===
To prepare for his role as an ex-convict, Dustin Hoffman visited the Los Angeles County Jail, where he was processed like a real inmate, including fingerprinting and booking procedures. As a joke, a desk sergeant ran his name through the police computer and discovered he had two unpaid traffic tickets, which Hoffman paid there and then.

=== Filming ===
Filming of Straight Time took place primarily in Los Angeles County, including Sylmar and Burbank, with additional photography occurring in the Inland Empire in and near San Bernardino. Principal photography began on February 9, 1977, at Folsom State Prison in Folsom, California, near Sacramento.

In addition to portraying the lead character, Hoffman had originally been hired to direct the film, and, according to producer Jerry Ziesmer, completed one day in this role. Ziesmer recalled that the first day of shooting at Folsom State Prison consisted primarily of a basic establishing shot, and that Hoffman requested constant camera resets, resulting in not a single frame being captured by day's end. With the studio concerned about Hoffman's ability to complete the project in a timely manner, Hoffman stepped down as director.

After this, Hal Ashby was Hoffman's preferred choice to direct the film, but had to withdraw after developing health problems during the production of his Woody Guthrie biopic Bound for Glory, his lungs having filled up with the dust he had inhaled. Hoffman then approached several established directors who he had worked with — including Mike Nichols, John Schlesinger, Alan J. Pakula, and Bob Fosse — to direct the film. All declined, although Fosse later reportedly regretted turning it down, according to Hoffman.

Ultimately, Ulu Grosbard was hired to direct. Grosbard and Hoffman approached the filming using improvisational methods, and often worked evenings writing scenes to be shot the following day.

Grosbard was reportedly not on speaking terms with Hoffman after the production was finished. Grosbard said that Hoffman became too close to the work:

He had the project for five years, and he controlled it completely. By the time he called me, he had gone through four or five writers and six or seven drafts, and he had some of the best people in the field working for him. Dustin is a professional victim, and when you put yourself in that position, you can make preemptive strikes against everyone and feel righteous. I think he does care about quality, but that is not a license for his behavior.

=== Post-production ===
The film became the subject of litigation between Hoffman and First Artists over creative control. Before Hoffman had finished editing the film, First Artists exercised a clause to take over the project, since the shoot had gone 23 days over schedule and approximately $1 million over budget. Hoffman's lawsuit alleged that his right to the final cut had been violated, and that the take-over clause did not mean he forfeited all creative control. First Artists' countersuit claimed that Hoffman's "derogatory statements" damaged the film's reception and box-office performance. The outcome of the litigation has not been disclosed.

Dissatisfied with the finished film, Hoffman declined to promote it upon its theatrical opening, saying, "This is not my film, in any shape or form. I don't want to hurt it, but I don't think it reaches the potential it could have. I hope it's successful but I can't in good conscience promote it.”

In a 1979 interview with Tony Schwartz for The New York Times, Hoffman said he considered his performance in Straight Time to be his strongest to date, but was disappointed with how it ultimately came across on screen:

I was on it, I was doing the best work I'd ever done, and I knew the film wasn't supporting the performance. They passed rumors that I was crazy, acting irrational. Well, I wanted to go at my work meticulously and I wasn't allowed to, and so I was going crazy.

Hoffman later said he found it difficult to shake off the character of Max Dembo after filming: 'I just couldn't get him out of my system. After filming I shaved off the beard I grew for the part and scrubbed my face but he stayed with me. I just couldn't get that grimy feeling off.'

== Release ==
Warner Bros. theatrically released Straight Time in the United States on March 17, 1978.

=== Home media ===
Warner Bros. Home Entertainment issued the film on DVD on June 4, 2007. The Warner Archive Collection issued the film on Blu-ray on September 21, 2021.

== Reception ==
=== Box office ===
Straight Time earned $9,900,000 at the United States box office, but was a flop for Warner Bros. as it failed to earn a significant profit for the studio.

=== Critical response ===
Vincent Canby of The New York Times praised Straight Time as "a leanly constructed, vividly staged film" that "makes no attempt to explain Max. It simply says that this is the way he is. It requires us to fill in the gaps, and it's the measure of the film that we want to." He also praised the performances, particularly those of Hoffman and Russell.

Gene Siskel of the Chicago Tribune gave the film four stars out of four, and called it "a superior thriller, a riveting portrait of an ex-con", adding, "Most criminals in American movies are drooling, trigger-happy psychotics. In 'Straight Time,' the criminals are people, and, somehow, that's more disturbing ... Credit ultimately must go to Hoffman, who continues to avoid playing the million-dollar cardboard roles that so many of his peers are drawn to." At the end of the year, he named it the best film of 1978.

David Ansen of Newsweek wrote, "Though made up of familiar elements - an ex-con, bank robberies, lovers on the run - it is an unusual movie out of today's Hollywood and a very fine one. Small in scale, grittily realistic, charged with a fierce intelligence about how people live on the other side of the law, the film makes few concessions to an audience's expectations, but it has an edgy, lingering intensity."

Charles Champlin of the Los Angeles Times called it "riveting to watch from start to finish", adding, "Hoffman's Max has less dimension than some of his earlier characterizations. You wish his fight [to go straight] had gone on a little longer. But his cool, hard disillusion, his unsentimental realism and his fatalistic attitude toward a life that never got going makes its own impact."

Arthur D. Murphy of Variety panned the film as "most unlikable" because Hoffman "cannot overcome the essentially distasteful and increasingly unsympathetic elements in the character. Ulu Grosbard's sluggish direction doesn't help."

Gary Arnold of The Washington Post wrote that there were "authentic, gripping moments in the film", but "in some unavoidable way [Hoffman] just doesn't look threatening and ruthless. You're tempted to console him rather than run from him. The cunning and aggression that one might accept immediately if actors like Robert De Niro or Harvey Keitel were cast as Max are only theoretically apparent in Hoffman."

On the review aggregator website Rotten Tomatoes, 82% of 11 critics' reviews are positive, with an average rating of 8.3/10. Metacritic, which uses a weighted average, assigned the film a score of 64 out of 100, based on 9 critics, indicating "generally favorable" reviews.

In 2003, The New York Times placed the film on its The Best 1,000 Movies Ever Made list.

== Influence ==
Quentin Tarantino has cited Straight Time as an influence on his directorial debut, Reservoir Dogs, in which Eddie Bunker appeared as a jewel thief. Tarantino explained that his characters were closer to Max Dembo than traditional movie mobsters:

These guys aren't like the guys in Goodfellas. They're not wise guys or gangsters. They're like Dustin Hoffman in Straight Time: they do jobs. And a big thing in that line of work is professionalism, which is a way to bullshit themselves into thinking that this is an actual job and profession, not just hooliganism.

== Sources ==
- Arnett, Robert (2020). Neo-Noir as Post-Classical Hollywood Cinema (eBook). Cham, Switzerland: Palgrave Macmillan Cham. doi:10.1007/978-3-030-43668-1. ISBN 978-3-030-43668-1.
- Lenburg, Jeff (2001) [1983]. Dustin Hoffman: Hollywood's Antihero (Authors Guild Backinprint.com ed.). Lincoln, Nebraska: iUniverse. ISBN 0-595-18270-4 – via Google Books.
- Woods, Paul A. (2000). Quentin Tarantino: The Film Geek Files. London: Plexus Publishing. ISBN 0-85965-284-X.
- Zucker, Carole (2013) [1995]. Figures of Light: Actors and Directors Illuminate the Art of Film Acting (eBook) (reprint ed.). New York: Plenum Press. doi:10.1007/978-1-4899-6118-1. ISBN 978-1-4899-6118-1.
