= David Hines =

English writer, author and screenwriter

- Born: 1945 (age 80–81); Yorkshire, England
- Education: Brown University
- Occupations: Writer, author, screenwriter

David Hines (born 1945) is an English writer, author and screenwriter. He is the author of the screenplay of the film Whore, directed by Ken Russell.

== Biography ==
In 1957 Hines went to the William Morris School for the Arts. With the intention to become a dancer, in 1965 he moved to London and joined the Rambert School of Ballet and Contemporary Dance, a part of Brunel University. Two years later he worked with Stanley Kubrick as one of the character actors in 2001: A Space Odyssey. He returned to the Rambert School in 1969 and the same year he became a member of the London Ballet company.

After his wedding in 1967, he started working for the Pergamon Press and for the Evening Standard. In 1976 Hines divorced his wife. Subsequently, he worked for Michael Winner's film production company, Scimitar Films, but he resigned with the aim to write more novels and plays, working in the meantime as a part-time taxi driver.

His best known work is Bondage, a prize-winning monologue focused on a night in the life of a prostitute, inspired by a talking with an actual prostitute while he was working as a taxi driver. The monologue has been presented as a theatrical drama in the whole of Europe and made into a film by Ken Russell entitled Whore.

In 1994 he published Unattended Baggage, a play about two brothers. Three years later he published A Leap into Madness, a monologue about Vaslav Nijinsky.

Hines lives in London and in Italy.

== Partial list of books ==
- David Hines, Bondage, London, 1989
- David Hines, Batman Can't Fly, Faber and Faber, 1997, ISBN 978-0571175659
