= A Winter Rose =

- Directed by: Riz Story
- Written by: William J. Branca; Riz Story
- Produced by: Riz Story; Robert Miano; Gary Alan Kauffman
- Starring: Billy Zane; Taryn Manning; Kim Whalen; Edward Furlong; Theresa Russell
- Cinematography: Riz Story
- Edited by: Riz Story
- Music by: Riz Story
- Production company: TogethermenT Films
- Distributed by: Green Apple Ent.
- Release dates: June 2014 (Dances With Films); December 2, 2016
- Running time: 99 minutes
- Country: United States
- Language: English

A Winter Rose is a 2014 American drama and music film written, directed, edited and scored by Riz Story and starring Kimberly Whalen, Paul Sorvino, Robert Miano, Billy Zane, Taryn Manning, Edward Furlong, and Theresa Russell.

== Plot ==
Winter Rose, a troubled teenage orphan in Los Angeles, is forced to cope with her substance abuse problems when she gets a once in a lifetime chance to become an overnight international singing star.

== Cast ==
- Billy Zane as Preston Holdsworth
- Taryn Manning as Patricia Rose
- Edward Furlong as Willy
- Paul Sorvino as Skippy
- Samaire Armstrong as Simone
- Theresa Russell as Rachal Love
- Andy Dick as Billy Joe
- George Lazenby as Henry
- Jack Kehler as Mel Wieser
- Carmen Argenziano as Joe
- Robert Miano as Jimmy
- Mackenzie Brooke Smith as Young Winter Rose
- Rebecca Grant as Celebrity Interviewer
- Kim Whalen as Winter Rose

== Release ==
The film was first screened in 2014 at the Dances with Films Festival as the honorary OPENING NIGHT FILM. It was later released in the United States in a limited theatrical release on December 2, 2016. The Director's Cut version of the film was released in 2019 and features additional scenes and music.

=== Critical reception ===
The film was reviewed and written about in a wide range of publications including LA 411, who said, "Riz Story embodies Indie Spirit in A Winter Rose". Other coverage includes the Los Angeles Times, IndieWire, AM/FM Magazine, Soul Citi, and DesiMag.

=== Music ===
The original soundtrack from A Winter Rose features 26 original songs, performed by the cast. 24 of these original songs were written by director Riz Story, who also produced and mixed the album. 6 of the songs have been released as singles with all six having entered the Billboard Hot Singles Sales Charts Top Ten, including a #1 single and a #2 single.
