= Insignificance (film) =

1985 film by Nicolas Roeg

- Theatrical release poster
- Directed by: Nicolas Roeg
- Written by: Terry Johnson
- Based on: Insignificance by Terry Johnson
- Produced by: Alexander Stuart; Jeremy Thomas
- Starring: Gary Busey; Michael Emil; Theresa Russell; Will Sampson; Tony Curtis
- Cinematography: Peter Hannan
- Edited by: Tony Lawson
- Music by: Stanley Myers; Hans Zimmer (uncredited)
- Production companies: Recorded Picture Company; Zenith Productions; Channel 4
- Distributed by: Palace Pictures
- Release dates: 11 May 1985 (Cannes Film Festival); 2 August 1985 (United Kingdom)
- Running time: 110 minutes
- Country: United Kingdom
- Language: English
- Budget: $4 million–$6 million

Insignificance is a 1985 British alternative history comedy drama film directed by Nicolas Roeg, and starring Gary Busey, Michael Emil, Theresa Russell, Tony Curtis, and Will Sampson. Adapted by Terry Johnson from his 1982 play of the same name, the film follows four famous characters who converge in a New York City hotel one night in 1954: The Ballplayer (Busey), The Professor (Emil), The Actress (Russell), and The Senator (Curtis), inspired by Joe DiMaggio, Albert Einstein, Marilyn Monroe, and Joseph McCarthy, respectively.

Johnson completed the screenplay for Insignificance in mid-1984, and the film was shot on location in New York City and at Lee Studios in Wembley, England. The film premiered at the 1985 Cannes Film Festival, where it competed for the Palme d'Or and won the Technical Grand Prize. It was released theatrically in the United Kingdom by Palace Pictures on 2 August 1985. It received largely favorable reviews from film critics.

== Plot ==
On a crowded New York City street, people have gathered to watch a film crew shoot a sequence where The Actress in a white dress is standing on a grate while the rush of wind caused by a huge fan to imitate the subway going by below blows her skirt up around her waist. The Actress's husband, The Ballplayer, watches with obvious discomfort as she is ogled. The Actress, rather than join him afterwards, disappears in a taxi, leaving him behind. She stops at a store and picks up a variety of toys, flashlights, and balloons.

Meanwhile, The Professor is in his hotel room, working on pages of mathematical calculations. He is interrupted by The Senator, who has come to alternately coax and threaten him into appearing before a committee to investigate his activities and answer the famous question, "Are you now or have you ever been...?". The Professor refuses and says he will never appear. The Senator leaves, saying he'll be back to get him at 8 a.m. the following morning.

The Actress appears at the door of the Professor's hotel room, and he invites her in. They talk about fame, being chased, and the stars. She does a lively demonstration of the theory of relativity using the toys and flashlights and balloons. She tells The Professor he is at the top of her list of people she'd like to sleep with. They decide to go to bed, but are interrupted by the arrival of The Ballplayer, who has tracked her to the hotel. The Professor leaves them alone and goes to find another room, meeting a Cherokee elevator man with whom he speaks. The Actress and The Ballplayer talk about their marriage; The Actress tells her husband she believes she is pregnant, but he has fallen asleep.

The following morning The Senator arrives at The Professor's room to find him gone, but The Actress naked and alone in The Professor's bed. He mistakes her for a call girl and threatens to use her to expose and embarrass The Professor, then punches her hard in the abdomen, causing her to collapse in pain. The Professor returns while The Senator is collecting all of the hundreds of pages of The Professor's work to take away with him. The Professor grabs the papers and throws them out of the windows, while The Actress writhes in agony on the bed. The Senator leaves, defeated in his purpose. The Ballplayer returns and talks about his fame in the baseball world, and confides in him about his marital problems while The Actress is in the bathroom, possibly suffering a miscarriage. She finally announces to him that their marriage is over, and he leaves.

The Actress becomes impatient with The Professor, sensing that he is hiding something. He is sitting on the bed with his watch, which has stopped at 8:15, in one hand, and the alarm clock in the other as the hour approaches 8:15 (the time that "Little Boy" was dropped on Hiroshima). He confesses his terrible feelings of guilt about the event, and she reassures him. Right at 8:15 a.m. as she is leaving, he has a vision of the destruction of the room, Hiroshima, and the world. The Actress's skirt swirls in flames as she burns in his vision. Suddenly The Professor's vision stops and reverses itself, and the world is restored to order. The Actress smiles at The Professor, who smiles back as she waves and leaves.

== Cast ==
- Gary Busey as The Ballplayer
- Michael Emil as The Professor
- Theresa Russell as The Actress
- Tony Curtis as The Senator
- Will Sampson as Elevator attendant ("The Indian")
- Patrick Kilpatrick as Driver
- Ian O'Connell as Assistant director
- George Holmes as Actor
- Richard Davidson as Director of photography
- Mitchell Greenberg as Technician
- Raynor Scheine as Autograph hunter
- Jude Ciccolella as Gaffer
- Lou Hirsch as Charlie
- Ray Charleson as Bud
- Joel Cutrara as Drunk in bar

Future WCW wrestler Daffney appears as a featured extra.

== Production ==
=== Development ===
Insignificance was originally a play, written by Terry Johnson and performed at the Royal Court Theatre in London in 1982, with Judy Davis as The Actress. Johnson was inspired to write the play after reading that an autographed photograph of Einstein was found amongst Marilyn Monroe's possessions upon her death. The idea of their meeting piqued his interest, and he wrote what became a meditation on the nature of fame. "It was always meant to be a play about the era, about fame ...what these people stood for, the fact that this was different from what they are." He was interested in exploring the differences between who these people really were, as opposed to what qualities others assumed or imbued them with. Johnson acknowledges that there are "lots of little cheats" in the play, mostly to do with exactly where and when The Seven Year Itch was filmed, and the timing of Monroe's marriage to Joe DiMaggio. Einstein was also never called to testify before the House Un-American Activities Committee, "but," he said, "had it gone on longer, I can see that as having been a big possibility. He was there in spirit, as it were".

Roeg, though not a theatre enthusiast, saw the play with several friends, and felt it "might be a tool to use. An incident came up in my own life and I thought, 'Good God, nobody knows a damn thing about anyone.' That was the premise that started me thinking about the piece again". Roeg notes that Insignificance is usually talked about as a meeting between Marilyn Monroe and Albert Einstein, but what moved him was the pain of the problems between The Actress and The Ballplayer, who are married but seem to know nothing about each other. Insignificance would become his first film adapted from a play.

Roeg asked Johnson to work on the screenplay, which at first meant simply reducing the play to approximately 90 minutes as opposed to two hours, but then Roeg began making suggestions which would expand the screenplay and include flashbacks to the characters' histories, and flash-forwards of imagination. His suggestions inspired Johnson to focus on a deeper development of the characters, while Roeg himself began to imagine how the film could open the play spatially as well as laterally. "He opened it backwards", Johnson said. Johnson's screenplay was completed by May 1984.

=== Casting ===
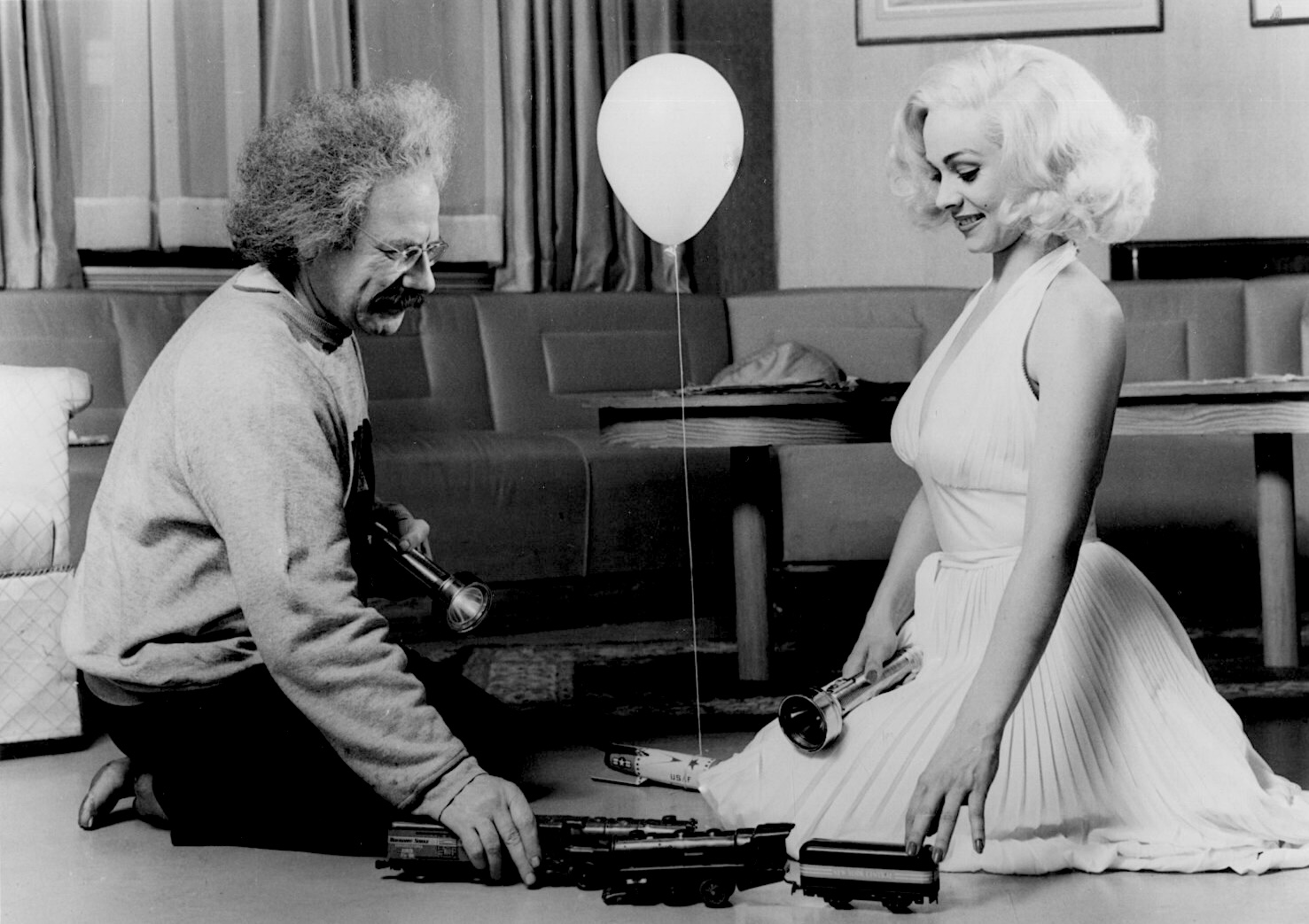
Emil and Russell as the Professor and the Actress

The principal casting of Gary Busey, Theresa Russell, and Tony Curtis was announced in September 1984.

Russell described her role as The Actress (Marilyn Monroe) "really challenging because at first I did not want to do it. That was a pile of horseshit I didn’t want to step in. Everybody had these preconceived ideas, and I didn’t want [to do] a caricature. That was kind of tricky to get my head around". To prepare for the part, Russell read several biographies on Monroe, studied her films, and trained with a vocal coach in order to speak in a higher register from her naturally lower voice.

=== Filming ===
All of the interiors for Insignificance as well as the Seven Year Itch scene, were shot at Lee Studios in Wembley Park, England. Some exterior sequences were shot on location in New York City.

Mise-en-scène was created through the use of Pablo Picasso's post-cubism painting Woman and Child on the Seashore which underscores The Actress' pain about her childlessness, while the fractured structure of the narrative was mirrored in the splintered image of Theresa Russell used as a nude calendar shot of The Actress. Created by photographer-collagist David Hockney, the image is, according to film critic Chuck Stephens, "a pinup in a hundred pieces, a centerfold sent through a centrifuge..." and is a reflection of The Actress. With "her much-exposed and famously exploited psyche already splintered into jagged, mingled shards of kittenish innocence, movie business cunning, overwhelming erotic appeal, and abject inner terror, Monroe was post-cubism's quintessential glittering star...perfectly pieced together and seen prismatically all at once." The image is also a metaphor for Roeg's non-linear filmmaking; Stephens notes that "for a cine-cubist like Roeg, two entirely disparate spatial and temporal dimensions are never more than a splice apart, and in Insignificance, the past is always present, and never goes away."

== Soundtrack ==
The soundtrack to the film, titled The Shape of the Universe, was released in the UK by the British label ZTT Records on 5 August 1985 as ZTT IQ4. It features six tracks performed and produced by Stanley Myers, who is credited in the film for the score. Roy Orbison sings the song "Wild Hearts", written by Orbison and Will Jennings, and Theresa Russell sings "Life Goes On", which is uncredited. Glenn Gregory, Claudia Brucken and Will Jennings perform "When Your Heart Runs Out of Time", written by Jennings, which Jennings also sings by himself on another track. Composer Hans Zimmer contributed three tracks he performed and produced, and Gil Evans and his orchestra contributed an interpretation of Mozart's Jupiter Symphony. The record also includes dialogue excerpts from the film.

Track listing
No.	Title	Performer	Length
1.	"A Dog Of a Night"	Stanley Myers	4:27
2.	"Remember Remember"	Hans Zimmer	2:43
3.	"Relativity One and Two and Three"	Stanley Myers	7:36
4.	"Forever (What the Hell)"	Stanley Myers	3:00
5.	"Wild Hearts (...Time)"	Roy Orbison	4:03
6.	"B-29 (Shape Of The Universe)"	Hans Zimmer	2:30
7.	"Life Goes On"	Theresa Russell	3:14
8.	"Jupiter Suite"	Gil Evans & His Orchestra	5:34
9.	"World of Theory (Explode)"	Hans Zimmer	4:38
10.	"When Your Heart Runs Out of Time"	Glenn Gregory; Claudia Brücken	4:24
11.	"It's a Dog Of a Night"	Stanley Myers	3:49

== Release ==
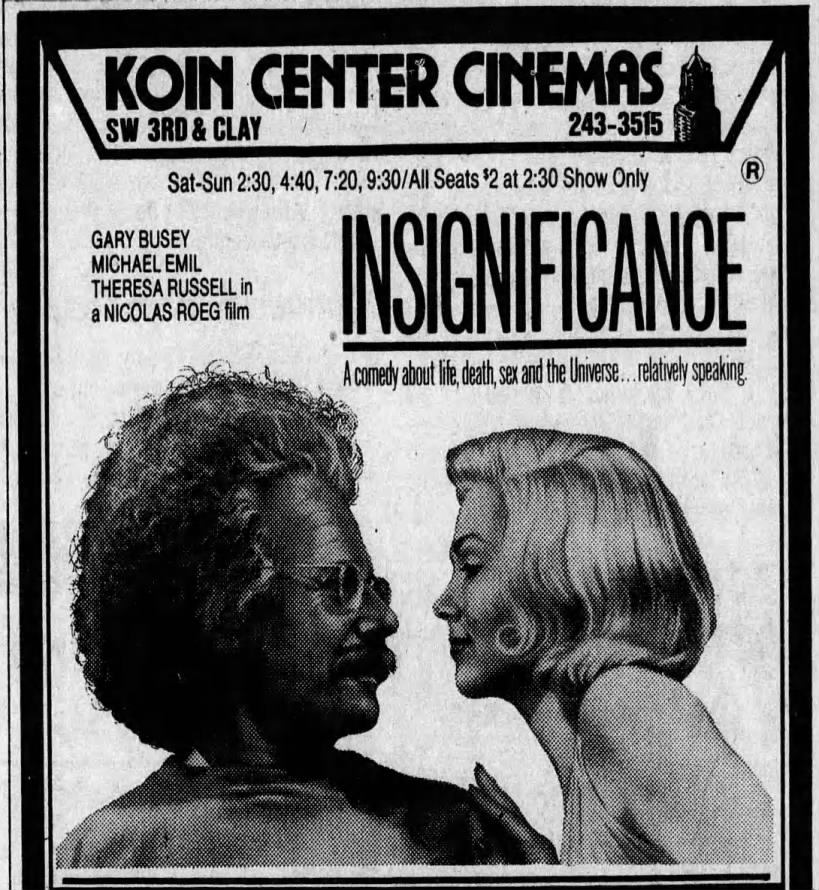
Newspaper advertisement in The Oregonian, October 1985

Insignificance premiered at the Cannes Film Festival on 11 May 1985. It was released theatrically in the United Kingdom on 2 August 1985, and premiered in Los Angeles the following week on 9 August 1985. A limited theatrical release followed in select U.S. cities following that fall, including Austin, Texas; Boston, Massachusetts; Cleveland, Ohio; Honolulu, Hawaii; and Portland, Oregon.

In Canada, the film screened at the Montreal World Film Festival in late August 1985, followed by theatrical engagements beginning in Toronto and Edmonton on 20 September 1985, and in Calgary on 6 December 1985.

=== Home media ===
Insignificance was released on VHS in 1986 by Island Alive and Lorimar. A LaserDisc was subsequently issued by Image Entertainment. In 2003, Artisan Entertainment released the film on VHS and DVD featuring a pan and scan presentation.

In June 2011, The Criterion Collection released a fully restored and re-mastered DVD and Blu-ray edition, containing interviews with Nicolas Roeg, Terry Johnson, long-time Roeg editor Tony Lawson, and the short film, "Making Insignificance". The release also contains a booklet with excerpts from the August 1985 Roeg-Johnson interview called "Relatively Speaking" in the 1985 Monthly Film Bulletin, and an essay by film critic Chuck Stephens.

== Reception ==
=== Critical response ===
On the review aggregator website Rotten Tomatoes, 73% of 15 critics' reviews are positive, with an average rating of 6.4/10.

At its Cannes Film Festival premiere, Alexander Walker made a public snipe against the film for being the festival's only British entry and featuring an all-American primary cast and setting.

Vincent Canby of The New York Times lauded the performances and screenplay, noting that it "moves inexorably toward total confusion and ends with a spectacular anticlimax. Yet the film is nearly always entertaining". Critic Roger Ebert praised the film, awarding it a three out of four star-rating, describing it as "more of an acting and writing tour de force than a statement on sports, politics, sex symbols or relativity. It begins by imagining its remarkable meetings, and ends by having created them. It’s all process, no outcome. I think in this case that’s OK". He also praised Russell's performance, writing: "She doesn't really look very much like Monroe, but what does it matter? The blond hair and the red lips are there, and so is the manner, which has been imitated so often, and so badly, that the imitators prove that Monroe was a special case. Russell doesn't imitate. She builds her performance from the ground up, and it works to hold the movie together".

Derek Malcolm of The Guardian wrote that "Roeg's short bursts of genuinely cinematic inspiration give the film a feeling that it is indeed a microcosm of the world at large, and that bigger issues are at stake that even the characters know. Insignificance tries hard and usually successfully to belie its title as well as underlining it". Russell Davies of The Observer praised the performances of Emil, Russell, and Busey, and described the film as "quite agreeable, but more playful than meaningful".

Roxanne T. Mueller of The Plain Dealer awarded the film three and a half out of four stars, writing: "Roeg weaves his themes of death, guilt, sexual impotence, ambition and responsibility amid images of chaos and visions of the apocalypse. Each of the characters deals with an unhappy past and it's where Roeg comes close to losing the comic drive of the piece, however black it remains at the edges... It's a challenging, exhilarating movie." Fred Haeseker, writing for the Calgary Herald, praised the performances and Roeg's tone, summarizing the film as "a delightful satirical fantasy... spun out of the slenderest of elements".

=== Accolades ===
Award/association	Year	Category	Recipient(s) and nominee(s)	Result	Ref.
Cannes Film Festival	1985	Palme d'Or	Nicolas Roeg	Nominated	
Cannes Film Festival	1985	Technical Grand Prize	Nicolas Roeg	Won	

== In popular culture ==
- The film is featured in Big Audio Dynamite's music video for "E=MC^{2}". Clips of the film are shown throughout the video and are referenced throughout the song.
- Jim O'Rourke's 2001 album Insignificance is named after the film.

== Sources ==
- Fischer, Lucy (2025). The Cinema of Converging Lives: Complex Films and Intersecting Stories in an Isolated World. Oxford, England: Oxford University Press. ISBN 978-0-197-76865-5.
- Lanza, Joseph (1989). Fragile Geometry: The Films, Philosophy, and Misadventures of Nicolas Roeg. New York City, New York: PAJ Publications. ISBN 978-1-555-54034-0.
- Sinyard, Neil (1991). The Films of Nicolas Roeg. London, England: Letts. ISBN 978-1-852-38166-0.
