= The Raggedy Rawney =

- Directed by: Bob Hoskins
- Written by: Bob Hoskins; Nicole de Wilde
- Starring: Bob Hoskins; Dexter Fletcher; Zoë Wanamaker
- Cinematography: Frank Tidy
- Edited by: Alan Jones
- Music by: Michael Kamen
- Production companies: HandMade Films; Virgin; Cannon Films
- Distributed by: Island
- Release date: June 30, 1989; (UK)
- Running time: 103 minutes
- Country: United Kingdom
- Language: English
- Budget: $5 million

The Raggedy Rawney is a 1988 British drama film starring Bob Hoskins, Dexter Fletcher, Zoe Nathenson, and Zoë Wanamaker. The story is about a young army deserter (Fletcher) in an unspecified time and country, who disguises himself as a madwoman and joins a nomadic gypsy caravan. The film involves the themes of the destruction and futility of war, the culture of the Romani people, and the bonds generated by love and family. The film was also co-written and directed by Bob Hoskins. Musician Ian Dury has a small role as a character named Weazel. The movie marked Hoskins' debut as a director.

The film was screened in the Un Certain Regard section at the 1988 Cannes Film Festival.

== Plot ==
The film centres around the character of Tom, a young army recruit in an unnamed time and country (presumably World War II-era Eastern Europe) who deserts after an artillery barrage kills his sergeant, in the process blinding a sadistic officer who tries to stop him. He is shell-shocked into muteness and takes refuge with a travelling gypsy caravan, led by Darky. Among the principal members of the clan are Darky's mentally disabled son, Simon, Simon's mother Elle who harbours a grudge against Darky, and Darky's only daughter, Jessie, who forms a romantic bond with Tom, eventually becoming pregnant by him. In order to avoid arrest and execution by the army, Tom disguises himself as a "rawney", described in the film as a kind of "magic" madwoman, who (in the gypsy culture) is able to see the future and can control animals. Frightened at first, Darky befriends the "rawney", thinking him or her to be good luck, but soon Darky is revealed to be a flawed leader, unable to protect his clan from war, and beset by family turmoil which is exacerbated by Tom's presence. Throughout the film, the army and the partially blinded officer is a menace, threatening the gypsies' way of life and those who befriend them. In a moving finale, the army corners the gypsy clan, who manage to hold them off with meagre rifles and pistols long enough to enable the young members of the clan, including Tom and Jessie, to escape, at the cost of their own lives.

== Cast ==
- Dexter Fletcher as Tom
- Zoë Nathenson as Jessie
- Zoë Wanamaker as Elle
- Bob Hoskins as "Darky"
- Ian McNeice as The Farmer
- Gawn Grainger as The Officer
- Jim Carter as The Soldier
- Veronica Clifford as The Farmer's Wife
- Rosemary Martin as Becky
- J. G. Devlin as Jake
- Ian Dury as "Weazel"
- Jane Wood as Vie
- Timmy Lang as Simon (credited as Timothy Lang)
- Jenny Platt as The Little Girl
- Jana Badurova as Farmer's Daughter

== Producer ==
Hoskins was in Australia making The Dunera Boys for Bob Weis when he told Weis the idea for the film, which was based on an old Romani legend about a deserter who was so shell shocked by war he dressed as a woman. "It's a tale my gran used to tell me," said Hoskins. Weis was enthusiastic and said he would produce it if Hoskins would write the script and direct. Hoskins had directed in theatre but not in film.

Hoskins wrote the script with the writer Nicole de Wilde. "She really took off on the idea," said Hoskins. "I wanted to direct it myself as I had a very clear view of how it should look.

Finance was raised from HandMade Films, who had made three films with Hoskins, The Long Good Friday, Mona Lisa and The Lonely Passion of Judith Hearne.

"I wanted to make an anti war film that didn't explore the sensationalism of war," said Hoskins. "I simply don't believe in war."

Hoskins cast Dexter Fletcher in the lead; the latter had played a small role in The Long Good Friday. Fletcher's two brothers and girlfriend also appeared in the movie. "Basically I got a lot of old mates together," said Hoskins. "The story had to be deeply felt and I wanted to be sure everybody felt the same way about it as I did. I think it shows in the final film."

Filming took place in Czechoslavakia over ten weeks. Hoskins claimed it came in £170,000 under budget.

== Release ==
The movie was to be released by Cannon in January 1989 but this was delayed by HandMade's legal suit against Cannon relating to non-payment of fees on other HandMade titles. (This also affected the release The Lonely Passion of Judith Hearne.) The movie did not come out until July 1989.

Hoskins was so exhausted after making the film he had a nervous breakdown took a year off.
