= Peter Hannan (cinematographer) =

British cinematographer

Peter Hannan (born 1 February 1941 in Sydney) is an Australian cinematographer who spent the majority of his career in Great Britain.

One of his first jobs in the film industry was as an assistant cameraman on Stanley Kubrick's 2001: A Space Odyssey (1968). Since 1972, Hannan has worked on more than 30 films as the director of photography. They include the Terry Jones films Monty Python's The Meaning of Life (1983) and Absolutely Anything (2015), Nicholas Roeg's Insignificance (1985) and Bruce Robinson's cult film Withnail and I (1987). Hannon has worked with Monty Python members and George Harrison's production company HandMade Films on multiple occasions. In addition to his films as a lead cameraman, he also worked as the Second unit photographer on blockbuster productions like Sleepy Hollow (1999) and Harry Potter and the Prisoner of Azkaban (2004).

His awards include a 2001 BAFTA TV Award in the category Best Photography and Lighting (for his work on Longitude) and a 2005 Academy Award in the special technical category Scientific and Engineering Award (together with Laurie Frost and Richard Loncraine, for the development of the remote camera head known as the Hot-Head).

== Filmography (selection) ==
As cinematographer

- Tour London to Istanbul (1972 documentary)
- Eskimo Nell (1975, credited as Peter Hannon)
- Slade in Flame (1975)
- James Dean: The First American Teenager (1976 documentary)
- Full Circle (1977)
- The Stud (1978)
- Blade on the Feather (1980, TV film)
- Sredni Vashtar (1981)
- Brimstone and Treacle (1982)
- The Missionary (1982)
- Monty Python's The Meaning of Life (1983)
- The Razor's Edge (1984)
- Dance with a Stranger (1985)
- Turtle Diary (1985)
- Insignificance (1985)
- Club Paradise (1986)
- Half Moon Street (1987)
- The Lonely Passion of Judith Hearne (1987)
- Withnail and I (1987)
- A Handful of Dust (1988)
- How to Get Ahead in Advertising (1989)
- Not Without My Daughter (1991)
- Longitude (2000, TV mini-series)
- The Gathering Storm (2002, TV film)
- Puckoon (2003)
- Egypt (2005, TV mini-series)
- Dough (2015)
- Absolutely Anything (2015)

Camera departement work

- 2001: A Space Odyssey (1968, assistant camera)
- Performance (1970, first assistant camera)
- Sleepy Hollow (1999, director of Second Unit photography)
- Harry Potter and the Prisoner of Azkaban (2004, director of Second Unit photography)
- Children of Men (2006, Second Unit director and photographer)
