= Simple Skincare =

British skincare brand owned by Unilever

- Product type: Sensitive skin
- Current owner: Unilever
- Country: United Kingdom
- Introduced: 1960; 66 years ago
- Markets: Worldwide
- Website: www.simple.co.uk
- Headquarters: United Kingdom
- Parent: Unilever

Simple Skincare is a British brand of soap and skincare products designed for sensitive skin. Simple has been owned by Unilever since 2010.

== History ==
The brand was developed in 1960 by the Albion Group. In the late 1980s the business was acquired by Smith and Nephew. In June 2000, Smith and Nephew divested its consumer products division; a management buyout, led by CEO Geoff Percy and Finance Director Peter Hatherly, for £140m resulted in the formation of Accantia, owner of the Simple brand.

In January 2004, a secondary buyout was completed. Following an unsolicited approach, the board of Accantia sold the company to Duke Street Capital for £225m. Accantia's existing senior management team remained in place.

In April 2009, Accantia changed its name to Simple Health & Beauty Group Limited. Simple Health & Beauty Group Limited was bought by the US company Alberto-Culver for £240 million in December 2009. Alberto-Culver was purchased by the Anglo-Dutch multinational consumer goods company Unilever in September 2010, and Simple was formally taken over around six months later.

== Advertising ==
In 1986, the company asked its advertising agency, Deighton & Mullen, to produce a TV commercial. Entitled 'Gilding the Lily', this ran on the newly launched Channel 4 and featured a pristine white lily being sprayed by robotic arms with colouring and perfume. It was created by Colin Underhay (art director) and Alex Pearl (copywriter) and directed by Len Fulford, while Lord David Dundas wrote the piano score in the style of Erik Satie, and Joanna Lumley provided the voice over.
