= How to Get Ahead in Advertising =

1989 film by Bruce Robinson

- US theatrical release poster
- Directed by: Bruce Robinson
- Written by: Bruce Robinson
- Produced by: David Wimbury; George Harrison; Denis O'Brien; Ray Cooper
- Starring: Richard E. Grant; Rachel Ward; Richard Wilson
- Cinematography: Peter Hannan
- Music by: David Dundas; Rick Wentworth
- Production company: HandMade Films
- Distributed by: Virgin Vision
- Release dates: 5 May 1989 (US); 28 July 1989 (UK)
- Running time: 94 minutes
- Country: United Kingdom
- Language: English
- Budget: $3.9 million
- Box office: $418,053 (US) £201,972 (UK)

How to Get Ahead in Advertising is a 1989 British black comedy fantasy film written and directed by Bruce Robinson, and starring Richard E. Grant, Rachel Ward and Richard Wilson. In the film, an advertising executive (Grant) has a nervous breakdown and finds himself concerned with the ethics of his profession. As a result, a talking boil grows on his shoulder, a manifestation of the cynical and unscrupulous side of his personality.

The film was produced by HandMade Films, and was released in the UK by Virgin Vision on 28 July 1989.

== Plot ==
A mentally unstable advertising executive, Denis Dimbleby Bagley, suffers a nervous breakdown while making an advert for pimple cream. He has a crisis of conscience about the ethics of advertising, which leads to mania. He then develops a boil on his right shoulder that comes to life with a face and voice. The boil takes a cynical and unscrupulous view of the advertising profession in contrast to Bagley's new-found ethical concerns. Eventually, Bagley decides to have the boil removed in hospital, but moments before he is taken into the operating room, the boil quickly grows into a replica of Bagley's head (only with a moustache) and covers Bagley's original head, asking doctors to lance it, which is done since nobody has noticed the switch from left to right nor the new moustache.

Bagley, now with the boil head, moustache, and personality (the movie's third personification from Grant after the stressed executive and the raving lunatic) returns home to celebrate his wedding anniversary, with the original head merely resembling a boil on his left shoulder. The "boil" eventually withers but doesn't die, yet Bagley resumes his advertising career rejuvenated and ruthless, although without his wife, who decides to leave his new cruel persona.

== Cast ==
- Richard E. Grant as Denis Dimbleby Bagley
- Rachel Ward as Julia Bagley
- Richard Wilson as John Bristol
- Bruce Robinson as The Boil (voice; uncredited)
- Jacqueline Tong as Penny Wheelstock
- John Shrapnel as Psychiatrist
- Susan Wooldridge as Monica
- Hugh Armstrong as Harry Wax
- Mick Ford as Richard
- Jacqueline Pearce as Maud
- Christopher Simon as Waiter
- Gordon Gostelow as Priest
- Pip Torrens as Jonathan
- Tony Slattery as Basil
- Rachel Fielding as Jennifer
- Pauline Melville as Mrs. Wallace
- Roddy Maude-Roxby as Dr. Gatty
- Joanna Mays as Phillis Blokey
- Sean Bean as Larry Frisk
- Tanveer Ghani as Hospital Doctor

== Production ==
The film was based on a short story by Bruce Robinson who called it "a black comedy, very political and is about how I perceive England now." Robinson adapted it into a film script. According to Richard Grant, Robinson asked him to be in the film in August 1986, during the making of Withnail and I, telling the actor "it's gonna be a masterpiece". Finance came from HandMade Films, which had backed Withnail and I. HandMade agreed to support it once Withnail opened well. However by that stage there was some doubt Grant would be able to make the film due to his commitment on the American movie Warlock. This was eventually sorted out and filming took place at Shepperton Studios in July 1988.

Robinson commented:

The Boil is in a vicious tradition of British satire that I am fond of. Swift, Hogarth, Rowlandson are very ugly but I like them and I tried to make The Boil in their spirit. It's repulsive and it's meant to annoy a lot of people. It is not the kind of thing that would come out of a cornflakes packet. The Boil is short hand for oak panelled rooms filled with liars representing vested interests. It's the suppurating filth that occasionally breaks out, usually wearing a wig and getting up in court to talk about justice.

The movie's budget was cut by a million pounds before filming, requiring a shorter schedule. This meant Robinson had to compromise from the more glossy style he was hoping to use.

During filming, Robinson said the film was "very much me, my sense of total paranoia about what's going on in the world. I want to make people laugh, sure, but underneath that is this strong sense of outrage, genuine outrage." He also said the film is "very much intended as a comment on the eighties. Basically I'm looking to kick the British in their bollocks."

In January 1989 George Harrison said "I can't wait to see" the film. "It's like your way of giving them the two fingers and I think we need to make films with people like Bruce Robinson who's just a little bit wacky and slightly different."

== Reception ==
=== Critical response ===
Michael Dequina writing for Film Threat, stated that the film was "Monotonous" and that it is "essentially a dark satire of contemporary consumerism, but to describe it as such is to hide just how incredibly bizarre it is".

Roger Ebert writes, "“How to Get Ahead in Advertising” is a sour, mean-spirited attack on advertising, starring an actor who can be repulsive and hateful without even trying. Those are the good things about it."

He concludes by pointing to its flaws and said ''My problem with “How to Get Ahead in Advertising” is that Robinson has so much he wants to say about the ills of the consumer society, and he has written it all down and given it to Grant as dialogue. The speeches reel on and on, talky and redundant, like an essay in a polemical magazine.''

Sheila Benson in a humorous tone for Los Angeles Times, stated that "He has conceived of all the accumulated horrors of the ad game--seductions for the joy of smoking, lures for pimple creams and toilet-bowl fresheners, warnings against bad breath, denture offensiveness and foot odors--erupting as a boil on the neck of one clever, upper-class v.p. of the ad game, Dennis Dimbleby Bagley."

Desson Howe from his June 1989 review said "If you like your movies with smooth skin, this might not be your cup of Neutrogena. But if you appreciate satire that reaches out and squeezes you where it hurts, you're going to enjoy yourself thoroughly. Extra butter on that popcorn?"

Sight and Sound wrote "strident allegory, marked by garbled rhetoric and frenzied slapstick; a splendid performance, however, brimming with placid cynicism, from Richard Wilson as the seasoned sales boss."

Bruce Robinson later said, “The things that were wrong with that film came out of my rage with Thatcher. I was so fucking angry. I love humour in films but the anger became too didactic in that one.”

On Rotten Tomatoes the film has an approval rating of 65% based on reviews from 17 critics.

In an interview with Jimmy Kimmel in 2019, Richard E. Grant said that Jim Carrey called him a genius for his work in the film.

Grant also wrote in his diaries that his performance led to his casting in Hudson Hawk.

=== Box office ===
The film made £201,972 in the UK.

In 1993, Handmade sued Warner Bros. on the grounds that the latter had failed to spend the agreed-upon amount to advertise the film. The outcome of the lawsuit is unknown.

== Notes ==
- Grant, Richard E (1997). With nails : the film diaries of Richard E. Grant. Picador.
