= BEIC =

The abbreviation BEIC may refer to:

- Biblioteca europea di informazione e cultura, a project in Milan, Italy
- East India Company, a.k.a. the British East India Company, a former British joint stock company
- British Egg Industry Council, an organisation set up in 1986 to represent the British egg industry
- British East India Company, a British joint-stock company founded in 1600
