= The Missionary =

- American theatrical release poster
- Directed by: Richard Loncraine
- Written by: Michael Palin
- Produced by: George Harrison; Denis O'Brien; Michael Palin; Neville C. Thompson
- Starring: Michael Palin; Maggie Smith; Trevor Howard; Denholm Elliott; Michael Hordern; Graham Crowden; David Suchet; Phoebe Nicholls
- Cinematography: Peter Hannan
- Edited by: Paul Green
- Music by: Mike Moran
- Production company: Handmade Films
- Distributed by: Columbia Pictures
- Release date: 5 November 1982
- Running time: 83 minutes
- Country: United Kingdom
- Language: English
- Budget: £2 million or £2.4 million
- Box office: $7.2 million

The Missionary is a 1982 British comedy film directed by Richard Loncraine, and starring Michael Palin and Maggie Smith. It was produced by George Harrison, Denis O'Brien, Palin (who also wrote the screenplay) and Neville C. Thompson.

== Plot ==
A Church of England priest, Reverend Charles Fortescue, works as a missionary in Africa and after ten years returns to England in the spring of 1906. As the ship docks, a fellow passenger, later identified as Isabel Lady Ames, bumps into him by accident.

Charles is engaged to Deborah Fitzbanks, the daughter of a fellow clergyman. She was only a child when he left but is now a young woman eager to be married and have lots of children; however, she dislikes being touched by him.

The Bishop of London gives him a new assignment, to set up a mission to rescue the women of the evening who frequent the London Docklands, but cannot offer him any funding. To assist him, Deborah writes to Lord Ames, the richest man in England. Charles reluctantly calls at their enormous mansion. The place has so many rooms that Slatterthwaite, the longtime butler, constantly has trouble finding his way about. He does eventually manage to bring Charles to the Ameses. Lord Ames loathes missionaries (among other things), but Lady Ames is inclined to contribute, especially as she finds him attractive (and tells him so). Somewhat alarmed, Charles tries to leave, but she insists he spend the night.

Late that night, she comes to his room. He tries to get her to leave but when they hear someone coming she hides under his bed clothes. It turns out to be Slatterthwaite, lost once again. After he realises that this is not his room, he departs. Isabel then takes advantage of the situation to take advantage of Charles. Satisfied, she funds his mission.

Charles industriously sets to work, but the first prostitute he speaks to is highly sceptical. When he insists that he does not look down upon her, she challenges him to prove it by sleeping with her. Apparently he does, and as word quickly spreads of his unorthodox methods, his mission is soon filled with young women. When Isabel pays a visit, she discovers him exhausted and sleeping on the floor, with three naked women in his bed. She cuts off her contributions.

When Charles tries to explain himself, Isabel states that she was hoping he would help her to change her life (Lord Ames, it turns out, is not sexually active with her). The women resume their trade to keep the mission going.

Fortescue is visited at the mission by the Bishop. Fortescue tries to explain that the mission has become so successful that they no longer need Lady Ames' money. The Bishop tells him that it's the mission's very success that is threatening its continuance. Other religious denominations in the area are complaining that they can't attract enough girls to their own missions, as they're all going to Fortescue. The Bishop tells him that, because of rumours, he must move to another parish, otherwise the Missionary Council will close the mission down.

The Bishop also tells him that someone has tried to murder Lord Ames by poisoning his food; the attempt failed only because Slatterthwaite took a wrong turn again and one of the gardeners died instead. From this, Charles deduces that Lady Ames intends to have her husband murdered. He races to their Scottish estate on the day of his wedding and manages to foil a shooting "accident" engineered by Corbett, an ardent admirer of Isabel. The bullet hits Lady Ames instead, though she is only wounded. Lord Ames takes butler Slatterthwaite as his new bed companion.

Meanwhile, the Bishop of London receives numerous complaints from other denominations about Charles's unusual methods. He gives Charles a choice: leave the mission or the Church. Charles chooses the latter, and is joined by Isabel. Photos at the end of the film show that they have two children together.

== Cast ==
- Michael Palin as The Reverend Charles Fortescue
- Maggie Smith as Lady Isabel Ames
- Trevor Howard as Lord Henry Ames
- Denholm Elliott as The Bishop
- Michael Hordern as Slatterthwaite/Narrator
- Graham Crowden as The Reverend Fitzbanks
- David Suchet as Corbett
- Phoebe Nicholls as Deborah Fitzbanks
- Roland Culver as Lord Fermleigh
- Rosamund Greenwood as Lady Fermleigh
- Timothy Spall as Parswell
- Neil Innes as Singer in Gin Palace

== Production ==
The film was one of a series of comedies featuring former members of Monty Python backed by Handmade Films.

== Reception ==
The film was a minor success at the box office and in December 1983 Denis O'Brien of HandMade Films said he expected the movie to be profitable.

== See also ==
- Rev. Harold Davidson, the "Prostitutes' Padre" whose attempts to rescue young girls from vice got him defrocked by the Church of England in 1932; he was later killed by a lion.
