= Those Glory Glory Days =

- Written by: Julie Welch
- Directed by: Philip Saville
- Starring: Zoë Nathenson; Sara Sugarman; Cathy Murphy
- Music by: Trevor Jones
- Country of origin: United Kingdom
- Original language: English

Production
- Producer: David Puttnam
- Cinematography: Phil Meheux
- Editor: Max Lemon
- Running time: 90 minutes
- Budget: £581,000

Original release
- Network: Channel 4
- Release: 17 November 1983

Those Glory Glory Days is a 1983 British made-for-television film about football directed by Philip Saville and starring Zoë Nathenson, Sara Sugarman and Cathy Murphy. The screenplay was written by the sports journalist Julie Welch. The film is inspired by Welch's childhood love of football, and helped to establish her as a screenwriter. The film was part of David Puttnam's 'First Love' series broadcast on Channel 4. It was shown on 17 November 1983 on Channel 4 as well as at the London Film Festival the same night.

== Plot summary ==
The film is about a group of girls growing up in 1960–61 London, who develop an interest in football and support for Tottenham Hotspur, which became the first English team in the 20th century to achieve the "double", i.e. winning both the English league and the FA Cup in the same season. Twenty years later, one of the girls is trying to make a career as a football journalist and is offered a lift home by her childhood hero Danny Blanchflower. The majority of the film is set during the 1960–1961 season and tells of the girls' obsession with Spurs.

== Cast ==
- Zoë Nathenson – Danny Julia
- Sara Sugarman – Toni
- Cathy Murphy – Tub
- Liz Campion – Jailbird
- Amelia Dipple – Petrina
- Elizabeth Spriggs – Mistress
- Julia McKenzie – Mrs. Herrick
- Peter Tilbury – Herrick
- Julia Goodman – Journalist Julia
- Stephan Chase – Father
- Bryan Pringle – Reg
- John Salthouse – Young Danny
- Danny Blanchflower – Himself
- Rachel Meidman – Young Julia
- Roddy Maude-Roxby – Brian
- Bob Goody – Doorman

== Box Office ==
Goldcrest Films invested £556,000 in the film but earned £313,000, resulting in a loss of £243,000.

== See also ==
- List of association football films
