= Eagle in a Cage (film) =

1971 American film by Fielder Cook

- Directed by: Fielder Cook
- Written by: Millard Lampell
- Based on: teleplay by Lampell
- Produced by: Millard Lampell; Albert Schwartz
- Starring: John Gielgud
- Cinematography: Frano Vodopivec
- Edited by: Max Benedict
- Music by: Marc Wilkinson
- Production companies: Group W Productions; Ramona Productions
- Distributed by: National General Pictures
- Release dates: 22 December 1971 (Los Angeles); March 1973 (UK)
- Running time: 103 minutes (UK); 98 minutes (U.S.)
- Countries: United States; United Kingdom
- Language: English

Eagle in a Cage is an American-British historical drama film, released in 1971.

The film was based on the teleplay of the same name by Millard Lampell, which aired on the Hallmark Television Playhouse on 20 October 1965.

== Plot summary ==
After his defeat at the Battle of Waterloo and surrender to the British Empire, Napoleon Bonaparte is delivered into exile and imprisonment on St. Helena, setting the scene for a psychological character study of the fallen Emperor and those upon the island with him as he rakes over the ashes of his career. After a failed escape attempt, the British Government offers him a chance for a return to limited power in France once again as a buffer against instability there; however, on the point of departure he is afflicted by the symptoms of stomach cancer and the offer is in consequence withdrawn, leaving him entrapped on the island and exiting history's stage.

== Cast ==
- Kenneth Haigh as Napoleon Bonaparte
- John Gielgud as Lord Sissal
- Ralph Richardson as Sir Hudson Lowe
- Billie Whitelaw as Madame Bertrand
- Moses Gunn as General Gaspard Gourgaud
- Ferdy Mayne as Count Henri Gatien Bertrand
- Lee Montague as Cipriani
- Georgina Hale as Betsy Balcombe
- Michael Williams as Barry Edward O'Meara
- Hugh Armstrong as British soldier
- Athol Coats as Sentry

== 1965 Television Play ==
Lampell had written an episode of East Side, West Side that was admired by George Schaefer, producer of Hallmark's Hall of Fame. He commissioned Lampell to write an original script. The play aired in 1965 starring Trevor Howard as Napoleon and Pamela Franklin as Betsy.

Howard, Lampell, and Franklin were nominated for Emmies. Lampell won. When he accepted it he said "I think I ought to mention that I was blacklisted." This led to the New York Times offering Lampell the chance to write an article about the blacklist. The incident is credited as helping draw mainstream public attention to the existence of the blacklist and contributing to its end.

== Production ==
Howard Barnes, an executive for Group W who knew Lampell in radio, contacted the author suggesting his television play would make an ideal film and they had an investor willing to put up half the money. Lampell said his adaptation "meant really rewriting pretty much everything, because there’s such a vast difference between what works on television and what works as a theatrical feature." The other financier fell through but Group W agreed to fully finance if Lampell agreed to produce.

Lampell wrote the part of the black general specifically for Moses Gunn who had been in a play of his, Hard Traveling. " There were actually black generals in Napoleon’s army, from Haiti and elsewhere, although not with Napoleon on St. Helena," said Lampell.

The original plan was to film in Italy but this proved too expensive so the film was shot in Yugoslavia.

== Reception ==
Lampell later thought, "Gielgud was wonderful, so was Richardson, so was Billie. Kenneth Haigh, who was a talented actor, just wasn’t up to the part of Napoleon, however, and that hurt the film."

The New York Times wrote "It should be obvious that the film-maker's imagination working at this level will create roles to tax the most imaginative of actors. But from his awesome cast, with a few exceptions, what he generally gets is a fairly professional elaboration of clichés."

Variety called it "a dramatically fascinating entry for the class market." The Los Angeles Times said it was "completely involving."

== See also ==
- List of American films of 1972

== Notes ==
- McGilligan, Patrick; Buhle, Paul (1999). Tender comrades : a backstory of the Hollywood blacklist. St. Martin's Press.
