= John Cigarini =

British advertising executive

John Cigarini (born Rome Italy 8 June 1944) is a retired producer of TV commercials in the United Kingdom and the United States.

After graduating from Durham University in 1967, Cigarini became an executive in a large advertising agency, Hobson Bates Ltd. In 1970, he joined the new commercials production company, Brooks Baker Fulford, later to become BFCS. Cigarini stayed with BFCS for 27 years, becoming partner and managing director in 1977, and President of the US operation, BFCS Inc., in 1982.

While Cigarini was at BFCS, the company won over 100 Gold, Silver, and Bronze Lions from the Cannes Lions International Festival of Creativity and the Venice International Advertising Film Festival. BFCS won the Palme d'Or, given to the top production company, six times. BFCS also won over 40 Clio Awards.

After a 30-year career in advertising, Cigarini retired in 1996. He now spends summers in the Tuscany and Umbria regions of Italy and winters in the East Cape region of Baja California, Mexico. In June 2014, Cigarini was recognized as an Honorary Citizen of San Leo Bastia in Umbria.

Cigarini is the author of Johnny Cigarini Confessions of a King’s Road Cowboy (memoirs of a terrible name-dropper).
