= Zoë Nathenson =

British actress (born 1969)

Zoë Nathenson (born 1969) is a British actress. In 1986, at the age of 17, she performed as the daughter of Bob Hoskins in the film Mona Lisa. Nathenson operates her own film acting school.

== Filmography ==
Year	Title	Role	Notes
1983	Those Glory Glory Days	Julia - Danny	
1986	Mona Lisa	Jeannie	
1987	Hearts of Fire	Fan at Funfair	
1988	The Raggedy Rawney	Jessie	
1994	I'm the Elephant U Are the Mouse	Franny	
1997	One Night Stand	Mickey	
1998	One Foot in the Grave	The Secretary	
2003	True Brit	Michelle Collins	(final film role)

== Television ==
Year	Title	Role	Notes
1984−1986	Dramarama	Frankie / Rachel	2 episodes
1988	The Comic Strip Presents	Anita	Episode: "Didn't You Kill My Brother ?"
1988	Scene	Suzie	Episode: "Two of Us"
1989–1999	The Bill	Liz Moore / Rita	2 episodes
