= The Knowledge (film) =

1979 British TV film by Bob Brooks

- Directed by: Bob Brooks
- Screenplay by: Jack Rosenthal
- Based on: Bob Brooks (idea)
- Produced by: Verity Lambert (executive producer); Christopher Neame (producer)
- Starring: Nigel Hawthorne; Mick Ford; Kim Taylforth; Jonathan Lynn; David Ryall; Michael Elphick; Maureen Lipman; Lesley Joseph; Derek Deadman; Derek Benfield
- Cinematography: David McDonald
- Edited by: Ben Rayner
- Music by: Jeff Wayne
- Production company: Euston Films
- Distributed by: Thames Television
- Release date: 27 December 1979
- Running time: 89 min
- Country: United Kingdom
- Language: English

The Knowledge is a 1979 British comedy-drama television film about a group of men and a woman doing "the Knowledge", the training required to become a London taxi driver. It was directed by Bob Brooks with an ensemble cast including Nigel Hawthorne, Mick Ford, Jonathan Lynn and Maureen Lipman.

== Premise ==
Four out of work Londoners apply to do "the Knowledge" to become London taxi drivers. They have to contend with learning approximately 15,842 streets and 468 set routes as well as Mr Burgess, a notoriously sadistic examiner from the Public Carriage Office.

== Cast ==
- Nigel Hawthorne as Mr Burgess
- Mick Ford as Chris Matthews
- Kim Taylforth as Janet
- Jonathan Lynn as Ted Margolies
- David Ryall as Titanic
- Michael Elphick as Gordon Weller
- Maureen Lipman as Brenda Weller
- Lesley Joseph as Val
- Gary Holton as Eddie Hairstyle
- June Watson as Lilian
- Philippa Howell as Miss Stavely
- Derek Deadman as Man in Dole queue
- Derek Benfield as Football Driver

== Production ==
In 1978 Jack Rosenthal received a telephone call from Bob Brooks, an American who had lived in London for many years, wanting to make a film about something "exclusive to London". After some discussion they decided on "The Knowledge", the training and testing required to become a driver of a hackney carriage. They initially pitched the idea to Euston Films as a feature-length drama before settling on the concept of a comedy drama. Executive producer Verity Lambert agreed to commission a 90-minute television film, despite reservations that Rosenthal and Brooks would struggle working together. Rosenthal researched the story by accompanying taxi drivers around London to collect their stories about doing The Knowledge. Lambert later recalled "Jack Rosenthal and Bob Brooks had this good idea – it was Bob's idea and Jack wrote it."

It was the first production by Euston Films to make use of Steadicam.

In his autobiography, Rosenthal describes Nigel Hawthorne as "such a lovely actor" who "gives a superlative, unforgettable comic performance as Mr Burgess, based on a real-life, notoriously sadistic examiner".

== Reception ==
When shown in 1995 on Channel Four during a Thames Television tribute, film historian Geoff Phillips described it as "certainly the best TV play Britain has ever produced".

In 2000 it was voted #83 in the BFI TV 100.

== Accolades ==
The Knowledge was nominated for a BAFTA in the category Television, Best Single Play in 1980.

== Theatrical version ==
A theatrical adaptation of the film, directed by Maureen Lipman, was staged at the Charing Cross Theatre in London, running from 4 September through 11 November 2017. The cast included Steven Pacey as Mr Burgess.
