= Death Line =

1972 British film by Gary Sherman

- U.S. release poster
- Directed by: Gary Sherman
- Screenplay by: Ceri Jones
- Story by: Gary Sherman
- Produced by: Paul Maslansky
- Starring: Donald Pleasence; Norman Rossington; David Ladd; Sharon Gurney; Christopher Lee
- Cinematography: Alex Thomson
- Edited by: Geoffrey Foot
- Music by: Wil Malone
- Distributed by: Rank Film Distributors (United Kingdom); American International Pictures (United States)
- Release dates: 17 November 1972 (United Kingdom); 3 October 1973 (Los Angeles)
- Running time: 87 minutes
- Countries: United Kingdom; United States
- Language: English

Death Line (also known as Deathline; U.S. title Raw Meat) is a 1972 horror film directed by Gary Sherman in his directorial debut, and starring Donald Pleasence, Norman Rossington, David Ladd, Sharon Gurney, Hugh Armstrong, and Christopher Lee. Its plot follows a university student and her boyfriend who, after witnessing a man disappear in the London Underground, become embroiled in an investigation into subsequent related disappearances. It is credited as one of the earliest examples of a cannibal film, released only months after Man from Deep River and nearly a decade before Cannibal Holocaust (1980).

An international co-production between the United States and United Kingdom, Death Line was filmed on location in London.

== Plot ==
Late one night at the Russell Square station in the London Underground, university student Patricia Wilson and her American exchange student boyfriend Alex Campbell find an unconscious man on the stairwell. Fearing that he may be diabetic, Patricia checks his wallet and finds a card that reads James Manfred, OBE. They inform a policeman but find that Manfred has vanished. Inspector Calhoun is assigned to look into the disappearance. Calhoun questions Alex and suggests that he and Patricia robbed the man.

Calhoun's colleague tells him about the history of the London Underground, particularly the Victorian railway workers who constructed the tunnels under dire conditions, and an urban legend that a group of descendants who survived an 1892 cave-in still live below ground. Meanwhile, one of the last surviving members of a family of these railway workers watches his pregnant female companion die; they have survived in the underground by resorting to cannibalism of the patrons. In an empty chamber Manfred's body lies mutilated. The man, now left in complete solitude, goes into a rage and brutally murders three maintenance workers.

One evening, Alex and Patricia take a train home and get off at Holborn station. Patricia realises she forgot her textbooks on the train. Alex attempts to retrieve them, but the doors close before he can exit; Patricia yells that she will meet him at home. Once the train leaves, however, Patricia is attacked by the cannibal. When she fails to meet him at their flat Alex seeks help from Calhoun, who is dismissive. Alex returns to Holborn station and enters the tunnel. He breaches an abandoned area of the Underground and finds remnants of the miners who worked there over a century ago. Meanwhile, Patricia awakens in the cannibal's lair. She finds him to be aphasic and unable to communicate with her, although he is capable of uttering one phrase, "mind the doors". She hits him over the head and manages to escape into a tunnel. He corners her and attempts to communicate with her, but becomes frustrated and violent.

Alex finds them and begins fighting with the cannibal, seriously wounding him with a kick to the head. Patricia begs Alex not to hurt him, and they watch as the cannibal stumbles into a passageway. Calhoun and several other detectives discover Alex and Patricia. As they search through the abandoned section, they find a room full of corpses laid in bunk beds – the generations of survivors from the cave-in that occurred a century before – including the cannibal, bleeding profusely and apparently dead. The detectives return to meet Alex and Patricia, and head to the station platform. After they leave, the cannibal is heard screaming "mind the doors!" once more before the credits roll.

== Cast ==
- Donald Pleasence as Inspector Calhoun
- Norman Rossington as Detective Sergeant Rogers
- David Ladd as Alex Campbell
- Sharon Gurney as Patricia Wilson
- Hugh Armstrong as The Cannibal (credited as "The Man")
- June Turner as Dying Cannibal (credited as "The Woman")
- Clive Swift as Inspector Richardson
- James Cossins as James Manfred, OBE
- Heather Stoney as W.P.C. Alice Marshall
- Hugh Dickson as Dr. Bacon
- Jack Woolgar as Platform Inspector
- Ron Pember as lift operator
- Colin McCormack as Police Constable
- James Culliford as publican
- Christopher Lee as Stratton-Villiers, MI5

== Production ==
=== Development ===
Death Line was a co-production between the United States and United Kingdom, produced by American film producer Paul Maslansky and executive-produced by Alan Ladd Jr. and Jay Kanter. The film marked the directorial debut of American filmmaker Gary Sherman, who developed the story. The screenplay was completed by Ceri Jones.

Sherman stated that the film had a political bent influenced by his time living in London since the late 1960s: "I had been bothered by British classism. I was living in Hendon at the time and I had to take the tube from Golder’s Green to the West End every day. I read up on how it was built. I read about the navvies, miners from Scotland and Wales, who were brought to London to dig the tunnels, and how they were mistreated. When there was a cave in, they didn’t dig them out. Because why spend money on working class people? Then there was another story I heard while I was in England, which was the legend of Sawney Bean. He was a highwayman whose family turned to cannibalism. They couldn’t buy food anymore, because someone would turn them in. So that all came together in DEATH LINE. Here’s a bunch of people who were left for dead because they were working class. They turned to cannibalism to survive. Mostly they ate tube workers and passengers, who were working class as well, so nobody cared. So that’s how the idea started." According to Sherman, Maslansky only noticed the commentary on the class system twenty years after it was released.

Jay Kanter, the financier of the film, was the original agent of Marlon Brando and had approached him about taking the role of the cannibal because he knew he wanted a role with plenty of makeup. While on set for Last Tango in Paris, Brando's son Christian fell ill with pneumonia and nearly died, which meant Brando rushed through filming that movie to take care of his son and therefore eliminate him from doing Death Line. At any rate, Sherman had Hugh Armstrong in mind for the part and went with him for the role.

=== Casting ===
Hugh Armstrong's role as The Man was originally to be played by Marlon Brando, but Brando had to back out when his son Christian became ill with pneumonia.

Christopher Lee agreed to do the film for scale, because he wanted to work with Donald Pleasence. Despite this, the two do not share the screen together for the majority of Lee's only scene, due to their large height difference (Lee was eight inches taller at 6 foot 5 inches). Director Gary Sherman kept them in separate shots until Lee sits down at the end of the scene, so that he would not have issues fitting them both into the same frame.

=== Filming ===
Aldwych (formerly Strand) station was used for underground sequences, as it was only open for weekday Peak services since 1962, and was subsequently closed completely in 1994. The shots of the platform at Russell Square show the exit sign stating "Way Out and to District Line", but there is no connection to the District Line at Russell Square. The sign had a section blacked out: it would normally read "Way out and to Temple station (District Line)". Temple station was the nearest station on the District and Circle line to Aldwych.

== Release ==
Death Line premiered in London on 17 November 1972 as a double bill with The Triple Echo and was later released in the United States under the title Raw Meat on 3 October 1973. In the United States, it was released in an edited cut to avoid an X rating. American International Pictures bought the film out from the financiers in what Sherman called "some cross-collateralization". AIP distributed it in the States by completely cutting the film down (with re-dubbing), retitled the film for its American release, and did a marketing campaign that made it appear as though it were a zombie film. Sherman has gone on record as stating his bitterness with how AIP treated the film, with the poster in particular being one he quite despised for having nothing to do with the actual movie. In Los Angeles, it was paired as a double bill alongside the comedy-horror film Cannibal Girls (1973).

=== Home media ===
Metro-Goldwyn-Mayer (MGM) released the film on DVD in North American on 26 August 2003. A region 2 edition of the film was released in the UK by Network on 3 April 2006. On 5 April 2011, the film was re-released on DVD in a six-film set alongside other MGM horror titles, Pumpkinhead (1988), Dolls (1987), Scarecrows (1988), Sometimes They Come Back (1991), and Invasion of the Body Snatchers (1978).

On 27 June 2017, Blue Underground released the film in a Collector's Edition Blu-ray and DVD combination pack. On 27 August 2018 the film was released on Blu-ray in the UK by Network. This version is notable for featuring the original 'X' certificate card from the BBFC at the start of the film. Blue Underground reissued the film in 4K UHD Blu-ray on 30 September 2025.

== Reception ==
The Monthly Film Bulletin wrote: "Perhaps the title not only refers to railways but is an ironic play on 'life-line'. Certainly the film is a powerful and terribly distressing embodiment of the Descent myth, built on the relationship between our complacent surface world of technology, social progress, moral emancipation, and an underworld that represents the very worst conditions in which life and 'humanity', however degraded, can survive. Against this underworld are set the LSE students, Alex and Pat, he armed with his insulated New York callousness, she with her limited compassion: sufficiently sympathetic and close to us for the moment when Alex kicks in the Man's head to save Pat from rape (and plague) to be intensely disturbing. More impressively, there is Donald Pleasence's inspector, set against both 'couples', his absolute separateness (he has no close human ties, no deep attachments) the condition for his independence and splendid resilience. But the Man is the film's real hero, unutterably horrible and repellent, yet irrefutably human; ourselves, as we might survive in the most terrible conditions imaginable."

The Radio Times Guide to Films gave the film 4/5 stars, writing: "Strong stuff in its day, Gary Sherman never directed a better movie than this grisly chiller, which provides dark scares while presenting an effective commentary on violence. Highly recommended."

On Rotten Tomatoes, the film holds an approval rating of 91% based on 11 reviews, with a weighted average rating of 7.22/10.

Roger Ebert of the Chicago Sun-Times called the film "a good debut, but it's undermined by several vast improbabilities in the script and by the painfully inept performance of one of its leads, David Ladd".

Robin Wood of The Village Voice praised the film, writing that it "vies with Night of the Living Dead (1968) for the most horrible horror film ever. It is, I think, decidedly the better film: more powerfully structured, more complex, and more humanly involved. Its horrors are not gratuitous; it is an essential part of its achievement to create, in the underground world, the most terrible conditions in which human life can continue to exist and remain recognizably human. [It] is strong without being schematic; one can't talk of allegory in the strict sense, but the action consistently carries resonances beyond its literal meaning".

Ramsey Campbell, in a review cut from The Penguin Encyclopedia of Horror and the Supernatural, but reprinted later, calls Death Line "an unusually bleak and harrowing horror film...very little in the film offers the audience any relief from the plight of the Man...The violence would be intolerable if it were not for the tragic dimensions of the film, but Hugh Armstrong's performance is one of the greatest and most moving in horror films".

In June 2026, musician Darren Hayman included Death Line in a list of his favorite films, and sharing "There are so many good things about this film. It has an absolutely filthy synth soundtrack."

== See also ==
- List of London Underground-related fiction
