= Mona Lisa (film) =

1986 film by Neil Jordan

- Theatrical release poster
- Directed by: Neil Jordan
- Written by: Neil Jordan; David Leland
- Produced by: Stephen Woolley; Patrick Cassavetti
- Starring: Bob Hoskins; Cathy Tyson; Robbie Coltrane; Michael Caine
- Cinematography: Roger Pratt
- Edited by: Lesley Walker
- Music by: Michael Kamen
- Production company: HandMade Films
- Distributed by: Palace Pictures
- Release dates: 13 June 1986 (US); 19 September 1986 (UK)
- Running time: 104 minutes
- Country: United Kingdom
- Language: English
- Budget: £2 million or £2.4 million
- Box office: £4,107,000 (UK)

Mona Lisa is a 1986 British neo-noir crime drama film directed by Neil Jordan, and written by Jordan and David Leland. It was produced by HandMade Films and stars Bob Hoskins, Cathy Tyson, and Michael Caine. The film is about an ex-convict (Hoskins) who becomes entangled in the dangerous life of a high-priced call girl (Tyson).

The film was nominated for multiple awards, and Hoskins was nominated for several awards for his performance (including the Academy Award for Best Actor), winning the Golden Globe Award for Best Actor and BAFTA Award for Best Actor in a Leading Role. The film takes its title from the song "Mona Lisa", which is heard throughout the film.

== Plot ==
George, a low-level working-class gangster recently released after seven years in prison, is given a job in London by his former boss, Denny Mortwell, as the driver and bodyguard for a high-priced prostitute named Simone. Mortwell also wants George to gather information on one of Simone's wealthy customers for blackmail purposes. Simone, who has worked hard to develop high-class manners and an elite clientele, initially dislikes the uncouth and outspoken George, and he regards her as putting on airs. But as George and Simone find out more about each other, they form a friendship, and George begins to fall in love with her. George agrees, at the risk of his own life, to help Simone find her teenage friend Cathy, who has disappeared, and who Simone fears is being abused by her violent former pimp, Anderson.

George increasingly finds himself torn between his feelings for Simone, his obligations to his boss Mortwell, and his relationship with his teenage daughter Jeannie, a sweet normal girl who has matured while he was in prison and wants to have her father in her life in spite of her mother's vehement opposition.

When Anderson stalks Simone to her flat and tries to slash her, George takes her to the secluded garage where he lives with his friend Thomas and then finds the drug-addled Cathy. He takes the two girls to a hotel in Brighton and gives Simone a gun for protection, but then discovers that the pair are lovers. When Mortwell and Anderson arrive to take back control of the girls, Simone shoots them both dead and turns her gun towards George. He punches her, takes the gun and leaves. Freed of his underworld obligations, he returns to a more normal life, working in Thomas's garage and spending time with Jeannie.

== Cast ==
- Bob Hoskins as George
- Cathy Tyson as Simone
- Michael Caine as Denny Mortwell
- Robbie Coltrane as Thomas
- Clarke Peters as Anderson
- Kate Hardie as Cathy
- Zoë Nathenson as Jeannie
- Sammi Davis as May
- Rod Bedall as Terry
- Joe Brown as Dudley
- Pauline Melville as Jeannie's mother
- Hossein Karimbeik as Raschid
- John Darling as hotel security
- Maggie O'Neill as girl in Paradise Club
- Bryan Coleman as gentleman in mirror room
- Robert Dorning as hotel bedroom man
- Perry Fenwick as pimp

== Production ==
The movie was inspired by a newspaper article about an ex convict charged in court for assault; he claimed he was defending some prostitutes from their Maltese pimps. Neil Jordan was taken by the article, later writing in his introduction to the published version of the script:

Dope, prostitution, race, Britain today, small-time pimps and petty thieves. In one breath it was talked about as a British Taxi Driver, in another as an update of Casablanca and The Big Heat, in another as a kind of opera without the singing bits - a tale as obvious as Carmen or Rigoletto, with passion or the lust for passion thwarted by the alltoo-concrete world outside. I inclined towards the latter.

David Leland wrote the first draft of the script which was rewritten by Neil Jordan. The lead role was originally offered to Sean Connery, who was interested but his asking price was too high. The part then went to Bob Hoskins. Jordan rewrote the script again with the actor in mind.

The film was going to be made by EMI Films, which then pulled out of filmmaking. Instead, HandMade Films stepped in. Michael Caine agreed to play a support role as a favour to his friend Bob Hoskins. Denis O'Brien of HandMade Films wanted Grace Jones to play the female lead but Jordan insisted on Cathy Tyson.

== Reception ==
=== Box office ===
The film was an art house success at the North American box office making over $10 million. It made over £4 million at the UK box office.

=== Critical ===
The film received a mostly positive critical reception when released in 1986.

Roger Ebert of the Chicago Sun-Times wrote of the two main characters: "The relationship of their characters in the film is interesting, because both people, for personal reasons, have developed a style that doesn't reveal very much." Time Out called it "a wonderful achievement, a dark film with a generous heart in the shape of an extraordinarily touching performance from Hoskins." Leonard Maltin's Movie Guide declared: "Hoskins and newcomer Tyson are terrific; Caine is wonderfully slimy in support." Pauline Kael praised the film: " ... Jordan shows a gift for making the emotional atmosphere visual, and vice versa. And the way he uses baroque touches and the clichés of old thrillers, they become part of a fluid, enjoyable texture, a melodramatic impasto with an expressive power of its own—a romanticism that pulls you along." Vincent Canby, writing for The New York Times, was less impressed, dismissing the film as "classy kitsch... as smooth and distinctive (and, ultimately, as insubstantial) as the old Nat (King) Cole recording of the song, which gives the film its title and a lot of its mood". Leslie Halliwell stated: "Only this actor (Hoskins) could make a hit of this unsavoury yarn, with its highlights of sex and violence. But he did."

On Metacritic Mona Lisa has a score of 85 out of 100 based on reviews from 20 critics. On Rotten Tomatoes the film holds a 98% rating based on 40 reviews. The site's consensus: "Bob Hoskins is outstanding in Mona Lisa, giving this stylish neo-noir a riveting centerpiece that sets it apart from similar stories."

== Accolades ==
Hoskins was praised for his performance and earned the Golden Globe, BAFTA, and Cannes Film Festival awards for Best Actor. He received his only Academy Award nomination for this film, but lost to Paul Newman in The Color of Money.

Year	Award	Result	Recipient
1986	Academy Award for Best Actor	Nominated	Bob Hoskins
1986	BAFTA Award for Best Actor in a Leading Role	Won	Bob Hoskins
1986	BAFTA Award for Best Actress in a Leading Role	Nominated	Cathy Tyson
1986	Golden Globe Award for Best Actor – Motion Picture Drama	Won	Bob Hoskins
1986	Golden Globe Award for Best Supporting Actress – Motion Picture	Nominated	Cathy Tyson
1986	Cannes Film Festival Award for Best Actor	Won	Bob Hoskins
1986	Boston Society of Film Critics Award for Best Actor	Won	Bob Hoskins
1986	Kansas City Film Critics Circle Award for Best Actor	Won	Bob Hoskins
1986	London Film Critics Circle Award for Best Actor	Won	Bob Hoskins; Tied with William Hurt – Kiss of the Spider Woman
1986	Los Angeles Film Critics Association Award for Best Actor	Won	Bob Hoskins
1986	Los Angeles Film Critics Association Award for Best Supporting Actress	Won	Cathy Tyson
1986	National Society of Film Critics Award for Best Actor	Won	Bob Hoskins
1986	New York Film Critics Circle Award for Best Actor	Won	Bob Hoskins
1986	Valladolid International Film Festival for Best Actor	Won	Bob Hoskins

== See also ==
- BFI Top 100 British films
- Trinity Court, Gray’s Inn Road, film location

== Notes ==
- Finney, Angus (1997). The Egos Have Landed: The Rise and Fall of Palace Pictures. Mandarin Paperbacks. ISBN 0 7493 1946 1.
