= Taxis of the United Kingdom =

Transportation in form of taxicabs in the United Kingdom

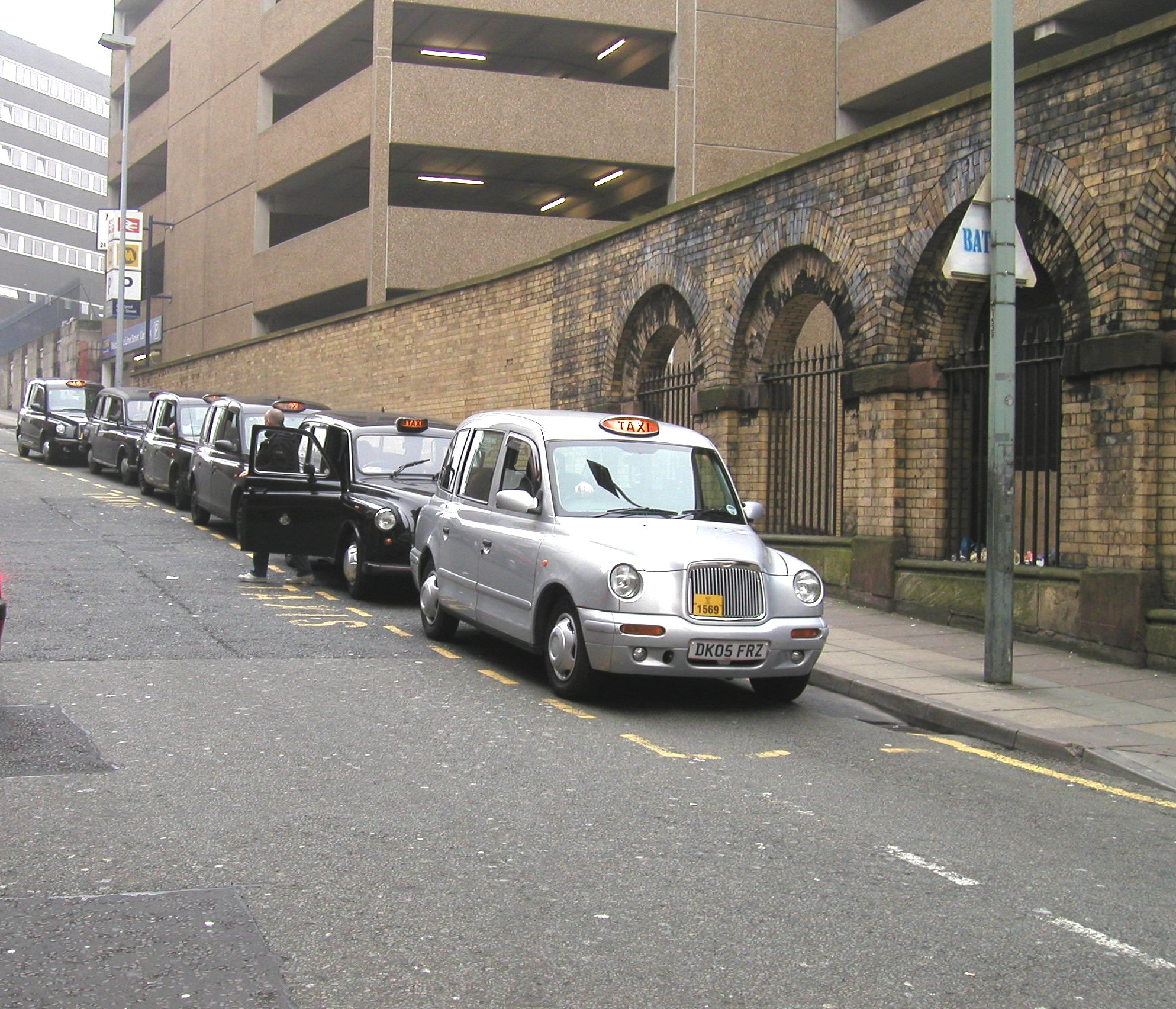
Taxicab rank with "black cabs" outside Liverpool Lime Street railway station

Taxicabs are available throughout the United Kingdom, and are regulated by local authorities.

In the UK, the name hackney carriage today refers to a taxicab licensed by the TfL Taxi and Private Hire office, local authority (non-metropolitan district councils, unitary authorities) or the Department for Infrastructure depending on the area. Some hackney carriages have also been exported for use in other countries.

== Types of cab ==
- Hackney carriages (taxis) can be flagged down on the street or hired from a taxi rank.
- Private hire vehicles ("minicabs") are passenger vehicles which can be either a 4-door saloon/5-door hatchback/estate car, carrying up to four passengers, or MPVs which are licensed to carry between 5 and 8 passengers. These cannot be hailed on the street; they must be booked in advance.
  - Chauffeur cars are a sub-set of private hire; generally a higher-value car such as a Mercedes-Benz or a Jaguar where the passenger pays a premium fare, but in return receives a higher level of comfort and courtesy from the driver, some of whom wear a uniform.

=== Hackney carriages ===
Only licensed hackney carriages can pick up passengers on the street and without pre-booking. London's traditional black cabs (so-called, despite now being of various colours and advertising designs) are specially constructed vehicles designed to conform to the standards set out in the Conditions of Fitness. London taxi drivers are licensed and must have passed an extensive training course (the Knowledge). Unlike many other cities, the number of taxicab drivers in London is not limited. For many years purpose-designed vehicles were used, but from about 2008 specially adapted "people carrier" vehicles have also been used.

There have been many models over the years. The space beside the driver's seat can be used for luggage, although there is much luggage room in the passenger compartment. For improved manoeuvrability, the turning circle is smaller than other vehicles of similar size (a black cab is said to be able to "turn on a sixpence"). The cab seats three people on the back seat, and two more in backwards-facing "jump seats". There is good headroom, to facilitate entry to and exit from the vehicle. A ramp for access by disabled people is fitted.

=== Private hire (minicabs) ===
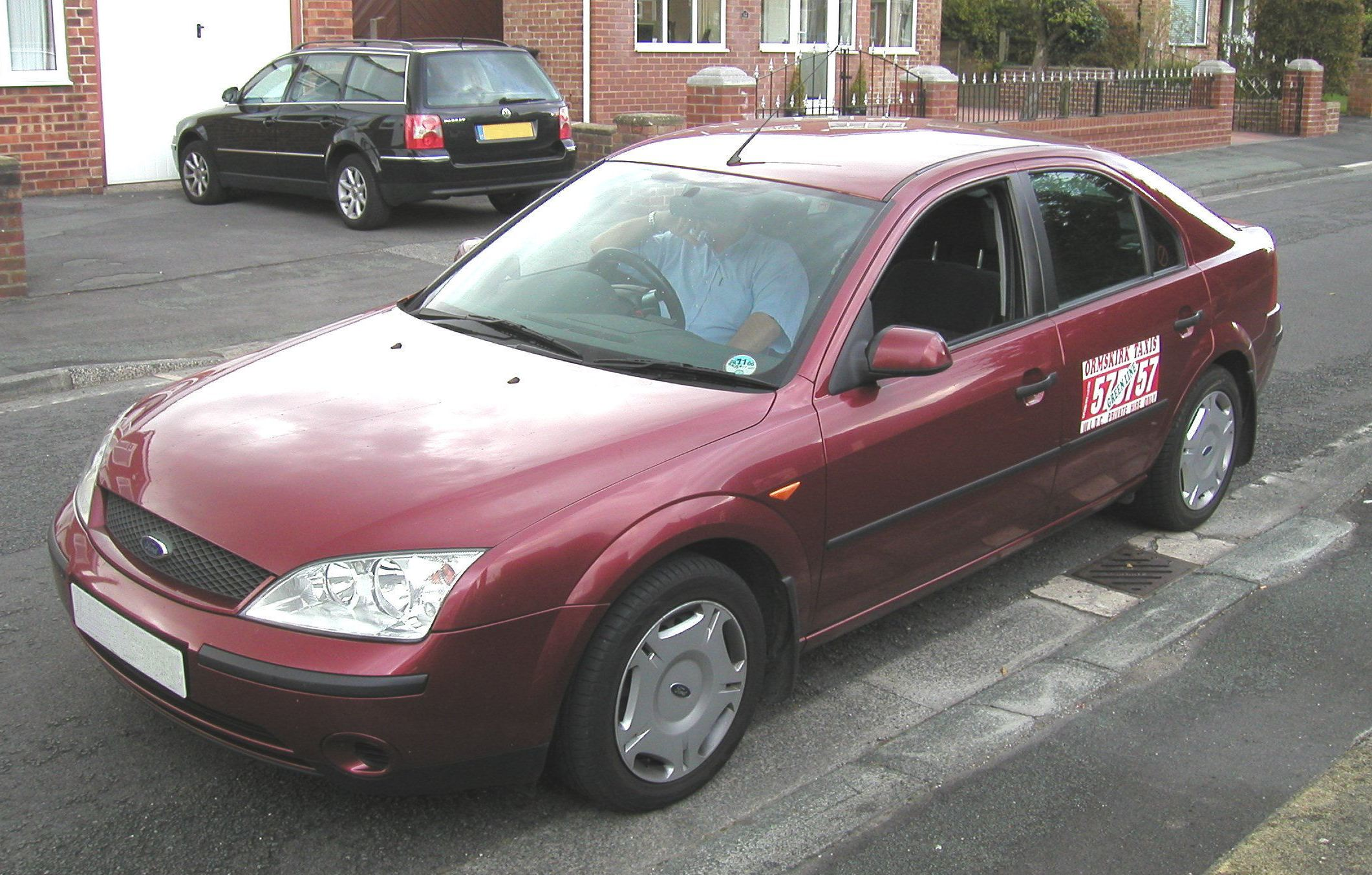
A Ford Mondeo UK private minicab with company name and telephone number on each side

Private hire vehicles began operating in the 1960s in competition with hackney carriages after a loophole in the law was spotted (although in some areas it is possible to hold a dual hackney/private hire licence). A minicab must be booked, for example, by telephone, internet, or fax, or in person at the registered minicab office. A minicab can be booked at the time it is required, but only at the office of a company registered to accept bookings rather than directly with a driver. The Suzy Lamplugh Trust lobbied for their licencing. Since 2001 minicabs have been subject to regulation in London and most other local authorities. London minicabs are now licensed by TFL (London Taxis and Private Hire), or TFLTPH, formerly known as the Public Carriage Office. This is the same body that now regulates London's licensed taxicabs, but minicab drivers do not have to complete The Knowledge, and although they must undergo a small "topographical test" in order to obtain a Private Hire Driver's Licence, they generally rely on satnavs or local knowledge to take them to the pick up and destination. All vehicles available for pre-booking by London minicab drivers must hold a private hire vehicle (PHV) licence showing that the vehicles are fit for purpose; this is updated with MOT tests twice a year after an inspection at a licensed garage. In London, new applicants must send their Topographical Test Certificate along with their application to the PH Driver Licensing Section of the TFLTPH.

== Regulation ==
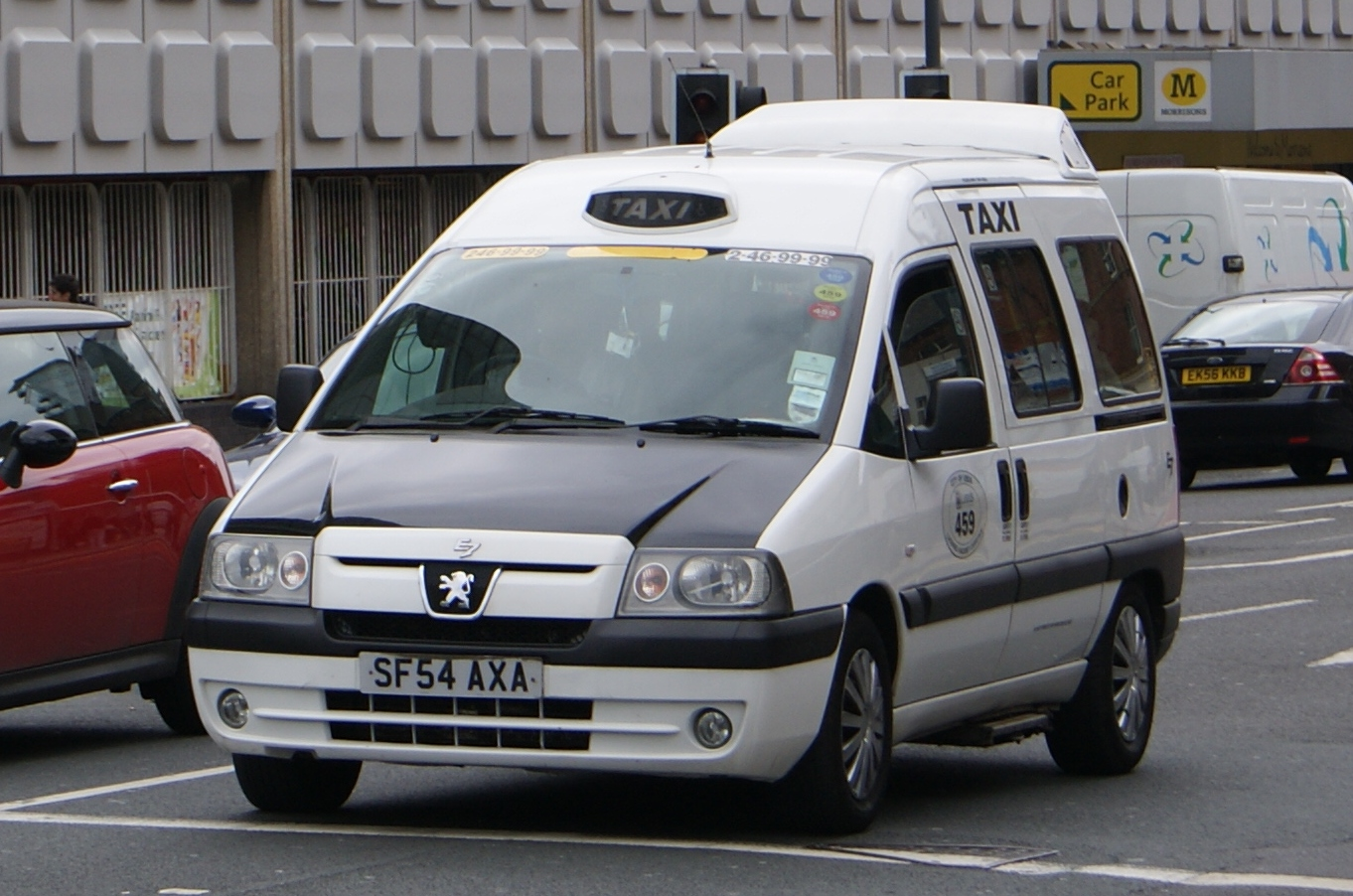
Hackney carriages in Leeds are white with black bumpers and bonnets

Outside London, taxis are licensed by the local authority, and in many places are required to be painted a certain colour. Most major cities predominantly use London taxis, again traditionally black but this is not always mandatory. Smaller towns and rural areas allow more varieties of passenger cars, which may require taxis to be painted in a particular livery as a licence condition. A distinctive livery helps improve identification, which in turn improves passenger safety and accessibility, as well as provide a more professional service and create and promote a local identity with taxis a common sight around town. Many towns use two-colour schemes, such as white vehicles with another specific colour on the bonnet and tailgate. The seaside city of Brighton uses white with an aquamarine colour, Windsor, home to the King's residence at Windsor Castle, uses white with royal purple on the bonnet and tailgate, and in the East Riding of Yorkshire white with green and Yorkshire rose markings. Basildon taxis display white with orange bonnet and tailgate, Leeds white with black, Cardiff black with white, and West Suffolk and Middlesbrough black with yellow. Bradford are all white with a green diagonal stripe on the front side doors. St Albans are all white with a yellow stripe running the full length of the side, and in Bournemouth they are pale yellow with a white stripe. Single colour schemes include blue in Bristol, teal in Guildford, and silver in Portsmouth, whilst white is used widely including in Southampton, Sunderland and Scarborough. In Hartlepool and Derby taxis are yellow, but both local authorities considered changing the livery in 2019 to reduce costs whilst still allowing taxis to be easily identified. Hartlepool proposed a two-colour scheme with a standard manufacturer colour such as white, silver or black as a base, and retain yellow only on the bonnet and boot, but abandoned plans after a consultation. Derby plans to change to black with a yellow diagonal stripe on each side.

Elsewhere there are two types of "taxi"—hackney carriages (licensed under the Town Police Clauses Act 1847), which may pick up fares on the street or be pre-booked and have a meter that charges a rate set by the local authority (alternatively the driver may negotiate a lower fare with the customer), and private hire vehicles (licensed under the Local Government (Miscellaneous Provisions) Act 1976) which must be pre-booked and whose rates are set by the private hire operator. Hackney carriages may only pick up fares off the street in the area in which they are licensed—however, they and private hire vehicles may pick up anywhere in the UK as long as they are pre-booked, and the driver, vehicle and operator are all licensed in the same borough. Some authorities have entered into agreements with neighbouring authorities to deputise each other's enforcement officers so they have the power to apprehend "trespassing" taxis from outside their area.

The legal way for a driver to operate outside their area is to obtain multiple licences, one for each licence authority area.

Luton is reported to have the highest number of taxicabs per head of population in the United Kingdom.

== Safeguarding ==
=== Taxis and Private Hire Vehicles (Safeguarding and Road Safety) Act 2022 ===
Taxis and Private Hire Vehicles (Safeguarding and Road Safety) Act 2022
- Act of Parliament
- Parliament of the United Kingdom
- Long title: An Act to make provision about licensing in relation to taxis and private hire vehicles for purposes relating to the safeguarding of passengers and road safety; and for connected purposes.
- Citation: 2022 c. 14
- Introduced by: Peter Gibson (politician) MP (Commons); Lord Borwick (Lords)

Dates
- Royal assent: 31 March 2022

Status: Current legislation

History of passage through Parliament

Text of the Taxis and Private Hire Vehicles (Safeguarding and Road Safety) Act 2022 as in force today (including any amendments) within the United Kingdom, from legislation.gov.uk.

The Taxis and Private Hire Vehicles (Safeguarding and Road Safety) Act 2022 (c. 14) mandates local authorities to use a national database to make people who lose their license in one local authority's area are not able to apply to other local authorities. The database had previously been voluntarily used by three quarters of local authorities.

== Accessibility ==
=== Private Hire Vehicles (Carriage of Guide Dogs etc.) Act 2002 ===
The Private Hire Vehicles (Carriage of Guide Dogs etc.) Act 2002 prohibited private hire vehicles from refusing to carry guide dogs.

=== Taxis and Private Hire Vehicles (Disabled Persons) Act 2022 ===
Taxis and Private Hire Vehicles (Disabled Persons) Act 2022
- Act of Parliament
- Parliament of the United Kingdom
- Long title: An Act to make provision relating to the carrying of disabled persons by taxis and private hire vehicles.
- Citation: 2022 c. 29
- Introduced by: Jeremy Wright MP (Commons); Lord McLoughlin (Lords)

Dates
- Royal assent: 28 April 2022

Status: Current legislation

History of passage through Parliament

Text of statute as originally enacted

Text of the Taxis and Private Hire Vehicles (Disabled Persons) Act 2022 as in force today (including any amendments) within the United Kingdom, from legislation.gov.uk.

The Taxis and Private Hire Vehicles (Disabled Persons) Act 2022 (c. 29) amends the Equality Act 2010 to included specific obligations on drivers of public hire vehicles and taxis, and operators "so any disabled person has specific rights and protections to be transported and receive assistance when using a taxi or PHV without being charged extra". Specifically, taxis and private hire vehicles are obliged to carry disabled passengers, their wheelchair or mobility aids. The amendments introduce a fine of £1,000 if a vehicle is found to not be compliant.

== See also ==
- Cabmen's Shelter Fund
- London Cab Drivers Club
- Taxicabs by country
- The Knowledge (1979 film)
