= Tattoo (1981 film) =

1981 film by Bob Brooks

- Theatrical release poster
- Directed by: Bob Brooks
- Screenplay by: Joyce Buñuel
- Story by: Bob Brooks
- Produced by: Joseph E. Levine; Richard P. Levine
- Starring: Bruce Dern; Maud Adams
- Cinematography: Arthur Ornitz; Michael Seresin
- Edited by: Thom Noble
- Music by: Barry De Vorzon
- Production company: Joseph E. Levine Presents
- Distributed by: 20th Century Fox
- Release date: October 9, 1981
- Running time: 103 minutes
- Country: United States
- Language: English
- Budget: $5.0 million
- Box office: $860,472 (domestic)

Tattoo is a 1981 American erotic thriller film directed by Bob Brooks and starring Bruce Dern and Maud Adams. It depicts the relationship between a fashion model and an eccentric tattoo artist that quickly turns sinister.

It was the last feature film produced by Joseph E. Levine before his death on June 21, 1987.

== Plot ==
Tattoo artist Karl Kinsky is approached to create temporary tattoos for swimsuit models on a photoshoot by renowned photographer Halsey. Initially apprehensive, Kinsky agrees after seeing photographs of one of the models, Maddy, who arrives late to the photoshoot but expresses admiration for Kinsky's arm tattoos and recognizes their Japanese influence.

After the shoot, Kinsky jealously eavesdrops on Maddy and her flirtatious boyfriend, jazz musician Buddy, whose relationship is strained because of Buddy's odd work hours. Maddy invites Kinsky to dinner, where he awkwardly asserts his dominance towards the maître d′, and then threatens to kill Maddy's ex-boyfriend Albert for using profanity and drunkenly flirting with her. Maddy invites Kinsky back to her apartment, but he says he has to catch the last train home. Instead, he goes to a sex show, where he aggressively speaks to a performer.

The next day, Kinsky surprises Maddy in Central Park with flowers and invites her to his apartment for dinner, where she admires his tattoo equipment and artwork. Kinsky explains his theory that women who get tattoos, which he calls "the mark", do so out of a desire to belong. When Kinsky tells Maddy she deserves better than Buddy, she calls him "old-fashioned", but begins to makes a pass at him, which Kinsky rejects, citing a need for commitment. Kinsky kicks Maddy out of his apartment for using profanity, but he follows her and insists they see each other again. After Maddy agrees to meet him at a Japanese art exhibition, Kinksy repeatedly calls and berates Maddy from a telephone booth. When she asks him to stop, he returns to his apartment and intently watches her modeling tape.

On the day of the exhibition, Maddy sends her friend Sandra to tell Kinsky that Maddy is out of town, and to ask him to return her modeling tapes. He visits Maddy's apartment, where he is told the same thing by Buddy. That night, Maddy kicks out Buddy and his band for keeping her awake. She is then visited by Kinsky, who incapacitates her with a chloroform-soaked rag. She awakens the next morning to find her chest, shoulders and back have been tattooed with floral patterns; when Kinsky tells her he is not finished tattooing her, she faints. The next day, when the tattoos have been partially colored in, Maddy makes a failed escape attempt, after which Kinsky makes her call Buddy at knifepoint to tell him she will not be coming home. As Kinsky becomes increasing violent, Maddy agrees to "wear the mark" in exchange for her safety.

Nearly finished with the tattoo, Kinsky stops and makes Maddy masturbate while he watches from another room, similarly to the peep show he visited earlier, and he orgasms as she begins weeping. Maddy berates him for not "being a man" and having sex with her instead. After Maddy plans to kill Kinksy with a shard of glass from the mirror, but is discovered, she seemingly resigns herself to allow Kinsky to continue expanding the tattoos over her entire body. When Kinsky announces he is finished, he undresses them both and begins to rape Maddy, who grabs the tattoo gun and plunges it into Kinsky's neck. Kinsky dies draped across Maddy's lap while she strokes his hair and stares off into the distance.

== Cast ==
- Bruce Dern as Karl Kinsky
- Maud Adams as Maddy
- Leonard Frey as Halsey
- Rikke Borge as Sandra
- John Getz as Buddy
- Peter Iacangelo as Dubin
- Alan Leach as customer
- Cynthia Nixon as Cindy
- Trish Doolan as Cheryl
- Anthony Mannino as George
- Lex Monson as Dudley
- Patricia Roe as Doris
- Jane Hoffman as Teresa
- Robert Burr as Ralph
- John Snyder as Hawker
- Kate McGregor-Stewart as pregnant wife

== Production and release ==
The film was written by Joyce Buñuel, the daughter-in-law of surrealist artist Luis Buñuel, based on a story by director Bob Brooks. The script impressed Joseph E. Levine who decided to finance the film enirely himself. Brooks made his debut as a feature director.

The film was featured in an April 13, 1980 New York Times article spotlighting films being shot on-location in New York City; the article mistakenly identified Rikke Borge as Dern's love interest.

The tattoo designs seen in the film are credited to Isadore Seltzer, a prolific illustrator and graphic designer known for drawing many Sesame Street Magazine covers.

The film had a contentious post-production and pre-release phase. Producer Joseph E. Levine made edits without informing director Bob Brooks, who wrote an angry letter to Levine accusing him of prioritizing the opinions of "assholes in Los Angeles".

Feminist group Women Against Pornography protested the film for allegedly equating violence with love. Particularly controversial was an image used to promote the film, which featured the nude body of a tattooed woman, shown from the neck down and bound at the ankle. Women Against Pronography defaced the advertisements in the subway, which reportedly delighted Levine, who considered it free publicity. Tellingly, although the release date was announced as November or December 1980 in the New York Tunes article, the film was delayed nearly a year until October 9, 1981.

The film was released in the United Kingdom by HandMade Films.

== Soundtrack ==
The songs "What's Your Name" and "Shot in the Dark" were written by Barry DeVorzon and Michael Towers, and sung by Euca Burrows. Other instrumental music is heard in the film, but an official soundtrack was not released.

== Critical reception ==
Tattoo earned a nomination for the Golden Raspberry Award for Worst Actor for Dern, who lost to Klinton Spilsbury for his performance in The Legend of the Lone Ranger.

Film critic Roger Ebert of the Chicago Sun-Times awarded the film two out of four stars. He wrote that he enjoyed the film's first two acts, and singled out Dern's performance as "very good", but thought the film faltered in the triteness of its climax. He wrote,"Tattoo could have been an effective and disturbing movie...[It] opens so promisingly that its crucial scenes are doubly disappointing. Because the film's first hour makes it clear that Tattoo is not intended as just another creepy horror film, the failure of the conclusion is all the more disappointing." New York Times film critic Janet Maslin gave the film a similar review. She praised the two leads, along with Borge and Frey, but wrote that while the film "begins with a bit of style...[it] doesn't take long...to turn predictable and slow."

The film's depiction of stalking has been compared to the much more successful films Taxi Driver (1976) and Maniac (1980).

== Cultural references ==
Singer Siouxsie Sioux wrote the lyrics of the Siouxsie and the Banshees' song "Tattoo" in 1983 just after watching the film.

In episode 4 of series 2 of the BBC sitcom The Royle Family, the film is discussed extensively. The character Denise calls it "absolutely brilliant", and explains the plot to Barbara and Cheryl, who are both fascinated and horrified. Meanwhile, in the living room, Dave is explaining the film to Jim, who questions why the protagonist would want to cover up his victim's breasts rather than look at them. Upon learning that the title of the film is Tattoo, Jim references the Fantasy Island character Tattoo and his catchphrase.

== Proposed Blu-ray release ==
In 2020, a Blu-ray release was planned by Scream Factory, but after going through two release dates, it was scrapped as they could not find any suitable elements for a new master of the film.
