= Go to work on an egg =

British advertising slogan

"Go to work on an egg" was an advertising slogan used by the United Kingdom's Egg Marketing Board during the 1950s and 1960s as part of more than £12 million it spent on advertising, including a series of television adverts starring the comedian and actor Tony Hancock and actress Patricia Hayes in 1965. The commercials were created by the British commercial photographer and director, Len Fulford. The proposition was that having an egg for breakfast was the best way to start the working day. Author, essayist and playwright Fay Weldon helped to create the campaign, and is supposed to have come up with the slogan.

In 2007, plans to rebroadcast the original television adverts were rejected by the Broadcast Advertising Clearance Centre (BACC), which observed that the adverts did not suggest a varied diet. The adverts were instead made available on an anniversary website.
