= Bob Brooks (film director) =

American film director

- Born: Bob Brooks; December 26, 1927; Philadelphia, Pennsylvania
- Died: September 2012 (aged 85); Berlin, Germany
- Occupations: Film director, photographer

Bob Brooks (26 December 1927 – September 2012) was an American film director, photographer, and advertising creative. He created numerous advertising campaigns, directed several thousand TV commercials in the UK, US, and Europe, and directed two feature films. Brooks was a founding partner of BFCS, an influential British film production company, and one of the founders of Design and Art Direction (D&AD). He was acclaimed within his lifetime, with numerous international awards.

== Early life ==
After graduating from Penn State University in 1950, Brooks arrived in New York in 1953 as an Efficiency Expert for the US Government. He soon realized that this was not his life’s work and he competed for and was awarded a scholarship at Cooper Union School of Art, which was known for its Bauhaus design tradition.

In 1955, Brooks started Cooper Union night classes and was simultaneously hired by Ogilvy and Mather to work in the art department as the matte boy. He has said he learned all the principles of advertising photography, typography, and layout from that job.

In 1957, Brooks joined Benton & Bowles (B&B) as an art director on a small proprietary drug account. At that time, B&B had just launched Crest fluoride toothpaste, which was rapidly losing market share. Procter & Gamble, one of B&B's major clients, put heavy pressure on the agency to save the product. The situation was so serious that the entire creative staff was asked to find a new campaign idea, and it was Brooks who found it.

Going against the photographic trends of the time, Brooks hired the famous illustrator Norman Rockwell to draw a series of children holding up a dental report stating, "Look Mom, No Cavities!" The campaign was successful, and the product not only recovered, but grew its market share. The phrase and the ads became icons of the late 1950s, and Brooks rose swiftly to Creative Group Head at the agency.

In the late 1950s, Brooks decided that he wanted to live and work in Europe, and he was sent to the London office of Benton & Bowles as the head of the art department. After a short while he was joined by Bob Gross, a copywriter Brooks had worked with at B&B NY. Together, they became Joint Creative Directors of the London agency.

== D&AD ==
The most exciting work coming out of London advertising in the early 1960s was being produced by the newly formed Collett Dickenson & Pierce Agency, where Colin Millward was beginning to make creative waves. Brooks was not happy with the existing London advertising award competition, The Layton Awards, and he felt that the advertising creatives were not being credited for their work. He contacted Millward to see if they could start a London Art Directors Club, similar to the New York club. They were joined by art directors Malcolm Hart and Bob Geers and began planning the new organization. At that point, Brooks was contacted by Alan Fletcher, who was also trying to form a similar organization with London’s graphic designers. Ultimately the two groups merged their efforts and Design and Art Direction (D&AD) was founded in 1962 with 30 members; it held its first awards exhibition the following year. In 1984 Brooks received the D&AD President’s Award.

== Bob Brooks Photography ==
In 1964, Brooks decided to leave Benton & Bowles and opened his own photographic studio, specializing in food and advertising still life photography. He bought a used 8 x 10 view camera from Len Fulford and with the help of Polaroid film taught himself how to take large format photographs. His main influences were Irving Penn, Howard Zieff, and Norman Rockwell. His first client was IBM, which was followed by a roster that included some of the best agencies in London.

The opening of Brooks' studio coincided with the inauguration of the weekend color supplements. In addition to his advertising work, Brooks produced work for The Sunday Times, The Observer, and The Guardian color supplements.

== BFCS ==
In 1967, he co-founded the film production company Brooks Baker Fulford with Len Fulford and Jim Baker. After various personnel changes the company was finally named BFCS. Initially Brooks directed the table top product commercials, but in 1969 Colin Millward asked him to direct a spot for Senior Service Extra cigarettes. It was a gentle funny commercial with a New York sense of comedy. Brooks later said, “It was one of the most charming commercials I did and straight off the bat it won a gold at Venice.” That first Cannes/Venice Lion d'Or came in 1970, and from that point onwards, his reputation was for comedic story-telling commercials. His last Cannes Advertising gold was in 1990 for Schweppes Tonic Water: Subliminal Advertising with John Cleese.

Many of his commercials became icons of British advertising of the 70s and 80s. The most famous was the 1974 BMP commercial for Cadbury’s Smash Instant Potatoes: Martians. It proved so successful that the campaign ran for years and was voted Number 1 in Campaign's Hall of Fame: The best British Ads of the Century, 1999.

Brooks left BFCS in 1993 along with Len Fulford. The company closed in 2001.

== Directing credits ==
- 1976: two episodes – "The Taybor" and "The Immunity Syndrome" – for the British TV series Space: 1999
- 1977 The Knowledge for Thames Television. A highly successful TV film written by Jack Rosenthal from an idea by Brooks, about the trials and tribulations of trying to become a London cabby. Nigel Hawthorne headed a superlative cast and gave what has proved an unforgettable performance as the Knowledge Boy's examiner, the Vampire. BAFTA Nomination for Best TV Play
- 1981 Tattoo for Joseph Levine Presents released by Twentieth Century Fox. Bruce Dern plays a tattoo artist obsessed with a fashion model, Maud Adams who he eventually kidnaps and tattoos. According to Roger Ebert, "Tattoo opens so promisingly that its crucial scenes are doubly disappointing. Because the film's first hour makes it clear that Tattoo is not intended as just another creepy horror film, the failure of the conclusion is all the more disappointing." On the other hand it was Ebert's partner, Gene Siskel's choice for a winner that lost at the box office.

== Awards ==
- New York Art Directors Club Award of Distinctive Merit 1961
- Cannes/Venice Advertising Film Festival 1970-1990 23 Lion d'Or
- New York One Show Gold Pencil Award 1975
- D&AD 1970-1984 6 Silver Awards
- The 1984 D&AD President's Award
- Directors Guild of America for Outstanding Directorial Achievement/Commercials 1983
- BAFTA Nomination for Best TV Play 1979
