= London Cab Drivers Club =

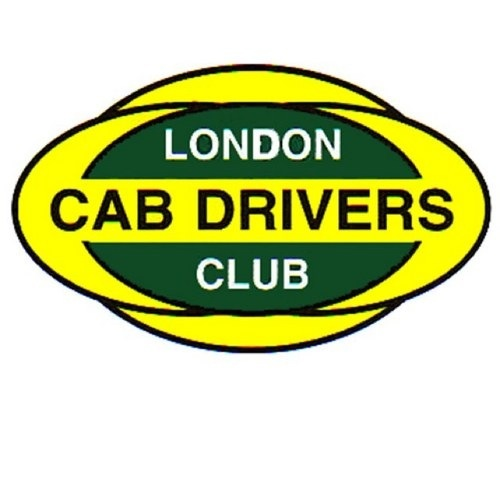
- Clubs Logo
- Founded: 1989
- Location: London, United Kingdom
- Key people: Grant Davis, general secretary
- Website: lcdcorg.wordpress.com

London Cab Drivers Club, known as LCDC, is a British mutual society, formed in 1989, registered under the Industrial and Provident Societies Act.

The group, aims to promote the rights of taxi drivers, lobby against "unfair legislation" and provides legal advice and protection to its members. Although members pay a membership fee, the LCDC does not operate with a view to profit.

== History ==
The London Cab Drivers Club was founded in 1989, as the MetroCab Club, to represent the interests of the pioneer MetroCab owners. However, in later years, the LCDC expanded to include owners of TXII's, TX1's, FX4's and Fairways as well. Jim Wells was the chairman of the highly successful Metrocab Club. The club was formed to sort out early teething problems to the newly manufactured Metrocab. The magazine was produced called The Metrocab News. With increasing problems from the unlicensed trade, drivers were urging the club to get involved with fighting off the enemy. The London Cab Drivers Club was formed. The Badge magazine was their rag.

In 2009, the chairman was Grant Davis and the club had about 1500 members. An issue for the organisation at this time was the increasing competition from mini-cabs.

== Publications ==
LCDC publish a free newspaper called The Badge, which highlights articles of interest to taxi drivers and updates LCDC Members on the club's activities. The paper regularly features a guest column from BBC London 94.9 FM Drivetime co-host Eddie Nestor.

== See also ==
- Hackney carriage
- Mutual organization
- Taxis of the United Kingdom
