= Egg Marketing Board =

Historical British product marketing board

The Egg Marketing Board was an agricultural marketing organization set up by the British government in December 1956 to stabilise the market for eggs due to a widespread collapse in sales. The board purchased all the eggs produced in the UK, graded them to a national standard, and then marketed them to shops. Each eggshell was stamped with a small "lion" logo as a mark of quality that would be seen by the customer. Egg producers were paid according to the quality of their eggs, less a deduction based on the number of eggs sent to packhouses for administration and advertising.

Slogans used by the board included "Go to work on an egg", introduced in 1957 in a £12 million advertising campaign and turned into a series of television advertisements starring Tony Hancock, Bernard Miles and also featuring Patricia Hayes and Pat Coombs that ran for six years from 1965 to 1971. Other slogans included "Happiness is egg-shaped", "Eggs are cheap", "Eggs are easy" and "Eggs are full of protein".

The board closed down in 1971 and the lion mark was dropped. The lion mark was however revived in 1998 by the British Egg Information Service.

== See also ==
- Go to work on an egg — advertising campaign from the 1950s directed by Len Fulford.
