= HandMade Films =

British film production and distribution company

- Type: Private company
- Industry: Filmmaking, distribution
- Founded: 1978; 48 years ago
- Founder: George Harrison; Denis O'Brien
- Defunct: 2013; 13 years ago
- Fate: Liquidation
- Headquarters: London, England
- Area served: Worldwide
- Key people: George Harrison
- Parent: Paragon Entertainment Corporation (1994–1999); Cartier Investments (1999–2006); Almorah Services Ltd (2010–2013)

HandMade Films was a British film production, distribution, and international sales company formed by George Harrison and Denis O'Brien. It was based in London and active between 1978 and 2013. Notable films from the company include Monty Python's Life of Brian (1979), The Long Good Friday (1980), Time Bandits (1981), and Withnail and I (1987).

== History ==
=== Foundation ===
HandMade Films was formed by former Beatle George Harrison and business partner Denis O'Brien in 1978 to finance the controversial Monty Python film Life of Brian. Harrison had been introduced to O'Brien by actor Peter Sellers in 1973. Soon afterward the two went into business together. The HandMade logo was drawn by Python's animator Terry Gilliam.

When the original financiers of Brian, EMI Films, pulled out of the project less than a week before filming was to commence, the creators had to find other financing. Harrison, a friend and fan of the Pythons, mortgaged his Friar Park home to finance the feature. Eric Idle of the Pythons later called it "the most anybody's ever paid for a cinema ticket in history". Life of Brian grossed $21 million at the box office in the US.

Harrison explained: "The name of the company came about as a bit of a joke. I'd been to Wookey Hole in Somerset ... [near] an old paper mill where they show you how to make old underpants into paper. So I bought a few rolls, and they had this watermark 'British Handmade Paper' ... So we said ... we'll call it Handmade Films."

=== First film and growth of productions ===
The first film distributed by HandMade Films was The Long Good Friday (1980), and the first it produced was Time Bandits (1981), a co-scripted project by Monty Python's Terry Gilliam and Michael Palin. The film featured a new song by Harrison, "Dream Away", in the closing credits. Time Bandits became one of HandMade's most successful and acclaimed efforts; with a budget of $5 million, it earned $35 million in the US within ten weeks of its release.

In December 1983, O'Brien said "The important thing is to make films that are intrinsically British, and stay with the strong roots here. Once you start aiming for that mid-Atlantic taste as the UK majors did, you're finished."

HandMade became known for its comedies but also invested in several violent movies such as The Long Good Friday and Scrubbers.

Harrison served as executive producer for 23 films with HandMade, including Shanghai Surprise, Withnail and I and the Oscar-nominated Mona Lisa. He made several cameo appearances in these films, including a role as a nightclub singer in Shanghai Surprise, for which he recorded five new songs. According to Ian Inglis, Harrison's "executive role in HandMade Films helped to sustain British cinema at a time of crisis, producing some of the country's most memorable movies of the 1980s." In 1987, HandMade Films made an agreement with independent motion picture distributor Island Pictures to distribute four films for limited theatrical release from 1987 to mid-1988: The Lonely Passion of Judith Hearne, Track 29, The Raggedy Rawney and Bellman and True.

=== Changes of ownership and recent history ===
Following a series of box office bombs in the late 1980s and excessive debt incurred by O'Brien, which was guaranteed by Harrison, HandMade's financial situation became precarious. The company ceased operations in 1991 and was sold three years later to Paragon Entertainment Corporation of Toronto, Canada. Afterward, Harrison sued O'Brien for $25 million for fraud and negligence, resulting in an $11.6 million judgment in 1996.

New owner Paragon Entertainment Corporation restarted production under the HandMade name in 1996–1997. The company's most notable release of that era was Lock, Stock and Two Smoking Barrels (1998). In 1999, Patrick Meehan and Cartier Investments acquired HandMade from Paragon.

In June 1999, The Equator Group plc became the exclusive distributor and manager of the HandMade Films library, and attempted to purchase the company from Cartier outright, but negotiations were unsuccessful until a reverse takeover agreement with Hand Made Holdings Ltd announced on 15 May 2006.

The Equator Group reincorporated as HandMade Plc on 8 June 2006 and the new company was traded on the Alternative Investment Market (AIM) stock exchange (changing its ticker symbol from EQG to HMF). Trading of HandMade plc shares was suspended several times, notably June to October 2009, after the company failed to provide 2008 audit results to shareholders.

On 29 April 2010, Almorah Services Ltd tendered a takeover bid, priced at £0.01 per share in cash and HMF was delisted from the AIM on 29 June 2010. HandMade plc was re-registered as HandMade Limited, a private company, on 2 February 2011. Handmade Limited entered administration on 11 July 2012, liquidation on 24 April 2013, and was dissolved on 22 February 2018.

In 2016, Park Circus purchased distribution rights to the HandMade film library.

In 2017, following an investigation by the Insolvency Service, three HandMade Limited directors were disqualified from acting as a director of a company: Patrick Anthony Meehan for 13 years, David Bernard Ravden for five-and-a-half years, and Peter William Parkinson for four years. The directors misused funds to "pay off relatives" and "on matters undisclosed to advisers, shareholder or potential investors".

== Filmography ==
Year	Title	Director	Rotten Tomatoes	Metacritic
1970s
1979	Monty Python's Life of Brian	Terry Jones	95% (64 reviews)	77% (15 reviews)
1979	A Sense of Freedom	John Mackenzie	—N/a	
1980s
1980	The Long Good Friday	John Mackenzie	96% (28 reviews)	—N/a
1981	Time Bandits	Terry Gilliam	91% (54 reviews)	79% (18 reviews)
1981	Tattoo	Bob Brooks	33% (6 reviews)	—N/a
1981	Venom	Piers Haggard	43% (7 reviews)	—N/a
1981	The Burning	Tony Maylam	86% (7 reviews)	—N/a
1982	Monty Python Live at the Hollywood Bowl	Terry Hughes (live segments); Ian MacNaughton (film segments)	—N/a	
1982	Scrubbers	Mai Zetterling	—N/a	
1982	The Missionary	Richard Loncraine	—N/a	
1982	Privates on Parade	Michael Blakemore	—N/a	
1983	Bullshot	Dick Clement	—N/a	
1984	A Private Function	Malcolm Mowbray	88% (8 reviews)	—N/a
1985	Water	Dick Clement	—N/a	
1986	Mona Lisa	Neil Jordan	97% (30 reviews)	—N/a
1986	Shanghai Surprise	Jim Goddard	13% (8 reviews)	—N/a
1987	Withnail and I	Bruce Robinson	94% (31 reviews)	—N/a
1987	Bellman and True	Richard Loncraine	—N/a	
1987	The Lonely Passion of Judith Hearne	Jack Clayton	—N/a	
1988	Track 29	Nicolas Roeg	67% (6 reviews)	—N/a
1988	Five Corners	Tony Bill	78% (9 reviews)	—N/a
1988	The Raggedy Rawney	Bob Hoskins	—N/a	
1989	Checking Out	David Leland	20% (5 reviews)	—N/a
1989	How to Get Ahead in Advertising	Bruce Robinson	57% (14 reviews)	—N/a
1989	Powwow Highway	Jonathan Wacks	100% (9 reviews)	—N/a
1990s
1990	Cold Dog Soup	Alan Metter	—N/a	
1990	Nuns on the Run	Jonathan Lynn	42% (26 reviews)	—N/a
1996	Intimate Relations	Philip Goodhew	—N/a	
1997	The Wrong Guy	David Steinberg	—N/a	
1998	Lock, Stock and Two Smoking Barrels	Guy Ritchie	75% (65 reviews)	66% (30 reviews)
2000s
2003	Eloise at the Plaza	Kevin Lima	—N/a	
2003	Eloise at Christmastime	Kevin Lima	—N/a	
2006	Eloise: The Animated Series	Wes Archer	—N/a	
2008	Manolete	Menno Meyjes	—N/a	
2008	Fifty Dead Men Walking	Kari Skogland	84% (51 reviews)	57% (16 reviews)
2009	Planet 51	Jorge Blanco	22% (108 reviews)	39% (21 reviews)
2009	Cracks	Jordan Scott	43% (49 reviews)	54% (12 reviews)
2010s
2010	127 Hours	Danny Boyle	93% (224 reviews)	82% (38 reviews)

== Unmade films ==
The following films were at one stage announced for HandMade Films but did not proceed to production:

- The Big Deal - announced in 1983 a film about a British businessman in South America
- Travelling Man - in 1984 this was to be made with Michael Caine and Sean Connery
- Breakfast of Champions - adapted from novel by Kurt Vonnegut script by Peter Bergman - the film was later made by another company in 1999.
- Storyring
- Stretch
- Big G
- Catfish Tangle
- Another World
- TVP - a film to be made with the Eurythmics
- a film about the Travelling Wilburys
