= BFCS =

Film production company (1966–2001)

- Industry: Film production
- Founded: 1966 as Brooks Baker Fulford
- Founders: Bob Brooks, Len Fulford, Jim Baker
- Defunct: 2001

BFCS was a commercial film production company.

== History ==
Bob Brooks, a Creative Group Head with Benton & Bowles Inc, New York, came to London in 1961 as Co-Creative Director for Benton & Bowles Ltd. He left the agency in 1963 to open a photographic studio in London. "Art directors were used to working with the top photographers in town, getting a certain kind of light, a particular attention to detail. However, feature film-makers were the main directors and they couldn’t give a damn what a plate of soup looked like, or bread, or an egg, or any of the textural things that made that kind of advertising so outstanding. Once the art director had a reasonable say in the creation of commercials, we came in"

BFCS was founded by Bob Brooks and Len Fulford, two successful London advertising photographers specializing in food and product photography, who together with producer Jim Baker opened Brooks Baker Fulford in 1966. Baker left the company in 1970 and the name changed to Brooks Fulford. The company moved to new quarters at 59 North Wharf Road, a modern custom built production center, designed by Brooks and Fulford. In 1973 Ross Cramer, former graphic partner of Charles Saatchi, joined as the third film director and the name changed to Brooks Fulford Cramer. In 1977 Martin McKeand, Managing Director since 1970, left to work in program television and was replaced by John Cigarini who then became a full partner. Cinematographer Michael Seresin, joined the company as another film director in 1977 and the company name changed yet again to Brooks Fulford Cramer Seresin. When Cramer left in 1981 it was decided to change the name one last time to BFCS, and so it remained until the end. At its peak BFCS had offices in London, Milan, New York and Los Angeles. In 1993 Cigarini bought out his UK partners in the US venture and settled in LA as BFCS Inc. which closed in 1996. In 1995 the original partners, Bob Brooks & Len Fulford left the company that they had founded and Michael Seresin along with Derek Coutts took the London company over until it finally closed in 2001.

== Awards ==
In 1970 Brooks Baker Fulford won its first Gold Lion at the SAWA Cannes Advertising Festival with "Tailor" a Senior Service Extra cigarette spot, directed by Bob Brooks, for CDP. This opened the door to more creative assignments and according to John Cigarini, at the time of his departure, BFCS had won over 100 Cannes/Venice Lions.

In 1974 Brooks Fulford was first awarded the coveted Palme d’Or, for best production company at the Cannes Advertising Festival. Then again from 1980-85 the company won the Palme d'Or for 5 consecutive times at Cannes, thus winning this prize for an unprecedented six times.

Other awards included: Directors Guild Of America, Best Commercial Director 1983; The One Show Gold Award, New York 1975; pencils at D&AD London; Gold & Silver arrows at the London British Television Advertising Awards plus over 40 Clio Awards in the US.

In 1984 the D&AD Presidents Award was presented to Bob Brooks.

In December 1999 Campaign Magazine London presented its Hall of Fame: The Best British Ads of the Century. The number one spot was awarded to the 1974 Smash Martians commercial directed by Bob Brooks, Brooks Fulford Cramer for BMP. Five other BFCS spots also made the same list.

== Alumni ==
Directors working with BFCS included Bob Brooks, Len Fulford, Ross Cramer, Michael Seresin, Alan van Rijn, Bryan Loftus, Richard Sloggett, Godley & Creme, Derek Coutts, David Deveson Thom Higgins, David Ashwell, Barry Sonnenfeld, Jim Edwards, Rod Butcher, Gale Tattersall, Larry Williams and Leslie Libman.
