= Hugh Armstrong (actor) =

British actor

- Born: 3 June 1944; East Retford, Nottinghamshire
- Died: 26 January 2016 (aged 71); London, England
- Occupation: Actor

Hugh Armstrong (3 June 1944 – 26 January 2016) was a British stage, television and film actor. He is best known for his portrayal of the monster in the 1972 cult British horror movie, Death Line, and as Harry Wax in How to Get Ahead in Advertising, acting alongside Richard E. Grant. His obituary, written in the magazine of his old school by Clive Akass, stated that 'life was Hugh's theatre. He was a travelling entertainment and until the illness that marred his later years, and sometimes even then, he brought laughter wherever he went'.

== Life ==
Armstrong was born in 1944 and educated in Bedford at Bedford Modern School. After a brief spell in the army he decided to take up acting, initially training at the Rose Bruford drama school.

Armstrong's first major role was as Ted the chauffeur in the 1968 film Prudence and the Pill, starring David Niven and Deborah Kerr. His next major role was playing the monster in Death Line alongside Donald Pleasence and Christopher Lee; his performance was said to have achieved the impossible by making a 'grotesque violent cannibal seem pitiful and sympathetic'.

Following his role in the 1972 film, Eagle in a Cage, Armstrong spent many years travelling the world, spending several years in India. He formed a theatre company at the Pune ashram of Bhagwan Shree Rajneesh and under his direction the company toured India, at one point performing before Indira Gandhi. As a member of the Rajneesh movement he left India for the United States, but left before the movement's scandalous collapse in Oregon.

Armstrong returned to the UK to work in film and television productions. He appeared as Jun Priest in the 1982 film, The Beastmaster, and played Harry Wax in How to Get Ahead in Advertising alongside Richard E. Grant. He took part in a number of television series throughout the 1990s and his final role was in the 2007 TV movie, Stuart: A Life Backwards.

In addition to his work in film and television, Armstrong was a member of the Royal Shakespeare Company and later the National Theatre. In 1975 he played R.P. McMurphy in One Flew Over The Cuckoo's Nest at the Everyman Theatre in Liverpool alongside Bill Nighy and Julie Walters.

Armstrong died on 26 January 2016. In the magazine of Armstrong's old school, Clive Akass wrote: 'Life was Hugh's theatre. He was a travelling entertainment and until the illness that marred his later years, and sometimes even then, he brought laughter wherever he went'.

== Filmography ==
=== Film ===
Year	Title	Role	Notes
1989	How to Get Ahead in Advertising	Harry Wax	
1982	The Beastmaster	Jun Priest	
1972	Eagle in a Cage	English soldier	
1972	Death Line	The Man	
1970	Girly	Friend in No. 5	
1968	Prudence and the Pill	Ted the chauffeur	
1968	Tell Me Lies	Guest	

=== Television ===
Year	Title	Role	Notes
2007	Stuart: A Life Backwards	Old Drunk	
2002	Barbara Wood: Hounds and Jackals	Albert Rossiter	
1999	Kiss Me Kate	Dad	
1989–98	The Bill	Billy Baines (1989), Declan Keely (1998)	
1993	London's Burning	Ken	Episode 6.7
1992–1993	Between the Lines	Det. Supt. Alwyne (1992), Chief Whip (1993)	
1993	Screenplay	Police Inspector	
1992	Tales from the Poop Deck	Amos	
1991	Minder	Station Officer	
1990	The Widowmaker	Michael Finch	
1989	Crime Monthly	Det. Insp. Steve Hobbs	
1971	UFO	SHADO Mobile 3 Officer	
1967	The Wednesday Play	Nightclub guest	
