= Julie Welch =

British sports journalist, author and screenwriter

- Born: Woodford, Essex, England
- Education: University of Bristol
- Occupations: Journalist, author, screenwriter
- Spouse: Ronald Atkin

Julie Welch is a British sports journalist, author and screenwriter who in 1973 became Fleet Street's first female football reporter. As a screenwriter she writes both screenplays and scripts for television, while as an author she has written both fiction and non-fiction. Some of her most notable works include the 1983 made-for-television film Those Glory Glory Days, which was inspired by her childhood love of football, and the books The Fleet Street Girls, the story of her experiences as a football reporter, Too Marvellous For Words, which describes her education at an all-girl boarding school, Felixstowe College, in the 1960s, and the best-selling The Biography of Tottenham Hotspur.

== Career ==
Welch studied philosophy at the University of Bristol before moving to London and working as a secretary at The Observer. She made her journalistic debut in 1973 after being asked to write a report on a football match between Coventry City and Tottenham Hotspur, becoming the first female Fleet Street journalist to report on a game of football. She told a 1999 interview with the Independent on Sunday's Lucy Pollard that she had faced hostility because of her sex, and that after the appearance of her first byline people had wondered if Julie was a unisex name. Welch is a winner of the Daily Telegraph Magazine Young Writer of the Year Award. Welch has also edited the Long Distance Walkers Association magazine, and has participated in the annual "Hundred" – walking 100 miles non-stop over 48 hours. She later wrote a book about her experience.

She made her screenwriting debut in the 1970s, but it was her 1983 made-for-television film Those Glory Glory Days that established her in this field. She was asked to write a screenplay about her childhood love of football by the producer David Puttnam. She wrote her book, Long Distance Information in six months after being made redundant from The Sunday Telegraph when the department in which she was working closed. Other works include 26:2, published in 2000, the novel Dangerous Dancing (1993), and The Ghost of White Hart Lane, co-authored with Rob White (2011).

== Filmography ==
- Angels (1975)
- Couples (1975–1976)
- Crown Court (1978)
- Horse in the House (1979)
- Those Glory Glory Days (1983)
- Playing for Real (1988)
- Ellington (1996)

== Bibliography ==
- Stars of the Screen, co-author (1989)
- Dangerous Dancing (1993)
- Long Distance Information (1999)
- 26:2 (2000)
- Out on Your Feet: The World of Hundred Mile Walking (2009)
- The Ghost of White Hart Lane, with Rob White (2011)
- The Biography of Tottenham Hotspur (2012)
- Too Marvellous For Words (2017)
