= The Lonely Passion of Judith Hearne =

- Video cover
- Directed by: Jack Clayton
- Screenplay by: Peter Nelson
- Based on: Judith Hearne by Brian Moore
- Produced by: Richard Johnson; Peter Nelson
- Starring: Maggie Smith; Bob Hoskins; Wendy Hiller
- Cinematography: Peter Hannan
- Edited by: Terry Rawlings
- Music by: Georges Delerue
- Production companies: HandMade Films; United British Artists
- Distributed by: Virgin Films
- Release dates: 23 December 1987 (United States); 21 November 1988 (Newcastle upon Tyne)
- Running time: 110 minutes
- Countries: United Kingdom; Ireland
- Language: English
- Budget: $4.5 million
- Box office: £112,190 (UK)

The Lonely Passion of Judith Hearne is a 1987 British drama film made by HandMade Films and United British Artists (UBA) starring Maggie Smith and Bob Hoskins. It was directed by Jack Clayton (his final theatrical film) and produced by Richard Johnson and Peter Nelson, with George Harrison and Denis O'Brien as executive producers. The music score was by Georges Delerue and the cinematography by Peter Hannan.

The screenplay was by Peter Nelson from the novel Judith Hearne by Northern Irish-Canadian writer Brian Moore. The story presents "a character study film about a woman's rage against the Church for her wasted life". Moore wrote the novel after leaving Ireland, in part because of the religious conflict there, and was living in Canada. The book was published in 1955 and was optioned for the stage and screen almost immediately. John Huston optioned it for a film with Katharine Hepburn. Director Irvin Kershner planned on casting Deborah Kerr. Eventually, Jack Clayton, a Catholic himself, was chosen to direct. The end result focuses on Judith Hearne's wasted life, "and while the bittersweet ending gives her back some measure of dignity, we are under no illusions that she has much more to look forward to".

The cast also features Wendy Hiller, Marie Kean, Ian McNeice, Alan Devlin, Prunella Scales, Sheila Reid, and Aidan Gillen in his first film appearance. The novel is set in Belfast, but for the film the story was relocated to Dublin.

Smith and Hoskins won awards for their portrayals of Hearne and Madden - she, as Best Actress, her fourth BAFTA, and he Best Actor at the Evening Standard British Film Awards, where Smith won jointly the Best Actress award with Billie Whitelaw.

In 1995 BBC Radio 4 produced a radio drama adaptation of Moore's novel directed by Michael Quinn.

== Plot ==
Dublin, the 1950s. Judith Hearne is a lonely, middle-aged, Irish Catholic spinster from a respectable family in distressed circumstances who spent her youth caring for a bossy and unpleasant aunt and as an adult gives piano lessons independently but is losing pupils. After moving into a rooming house in Dublin, she meets and becomes attracted to the landlady's widowed brother, the charming James Madden, who has returned from the United States. Madden notices her inherited jewellery and believes wrongly that behind a façade of respectable proprietry she is reasonably well-off and might invest in his business idea. She thinks that the relationship may become a romance for which she has always yearned. The misunderstanding on both sides sets in motion her self-destruction.

== Cast ==
- Maggie Smith as Judith "Judy" Hearne
- Bob Hoskins as James Madden
- Wendy Hiller as Aunt D'Arcy
- Marie Kean as Mrs. Rice
- Ian McNeice as Bernard "Bernie" Rice
- Prunella Scales as Moira O'Neill
- Peter Gilmore as Kevin O'Neill
- Áine Ní Mhuirí as Edie Marinan
- Kate Binchy as Sister Ignatius
- Rudi Davies as Mary

== Production ==
The novel was published in 1955 and there had been numerous attempts to film it over the years. John Huston wanted to film it starring Katharine Hepburn for Seven Arts Productions but was unable to raise finance.

Daniel Petrie tried to make it with Rachel Roberts and, in 1969, Irvin Kershner with Deborah Kerr. In the 1970s Jack Levin was going to produce a version with Anne Bancroft from a Brian Friel script, with Robert Shaw to co star. Then Bancroft dropped out and Vanessa Redgrave was going to star. No film eventuated. Jack Clayton greatly admired the novel and had tried to obtain the film rights himself as early as 1961 but they were never available..

In 1982 producer-writer Peter Nelson obtained the rights, and he tried to make a film with Shirley Maclaine and Mike Nichols. However Nichols wanted to relocate the story to Boston, Nelson objected and the director dropped out. Nelson then sought finance in the United Kingdom. He took the project to United British Artists, a production group made up of several key British figures including Maggie Smith, Richard Johnson, Albert Finney and Harold Pinter. Smith agreed to star in the film and Clayton was approached to direct. "I'd been trying to make it for twenty years," Clayton said. "It was sheer luck."

Finance mostly came from HandMade Films. Elton John also provided some of the budget. "I have such admiration for Handmade,” Clayton said. “Here was a subject that had been on the shelf for years because no one considered it commercial. But they went ahead.”

Nelson later said he felt his version was able to attract finance because his script emphasied the humour in the novel. "There are a lot of funny things in Judith Hearne and the script simply sharpens them," said Nelson.

Filming took place in July 1987 over seven weeks. There was ten days of work on location in Dublin and at Shepperton Studios. Clayton said he, Maggie Smith and Bob Hoskins took a third of their normal salary in order to get the film made. "It was very important for this," said Clayton. "After 25 years I understand perfectly well why it wasn't made."

== Background ==
The Lonely Passion of Judith Hearne was Clayton's first British film in twenty years, and last cinema feature. According to one critic "Smith gives a screen acting masterclass in what was widely acclaimed as her most memorable performance since her Oscar-winning turn in The Prime of Miss Jean Brodie". He stated that the "twitch of a facial muscle or near-imperceptible tonal shift in her voice conveys an entire lexicon of emotional information". Another noted that "Judith's phony airs and graces are captured by Smith through a vast range of movements and vocal inflections. The actress is equally adept when [...] portraying a dejected woman who's heading for a nervous breakdown. Judith's crisis of faith reaches its climax in an extraordinary scene in a Catholic church where she attacks the tabernacle on the alter in a hopeless attempt to find God".

Clayton exposes all the social hypocrisies of 1950s Dublin from the Church professing to help the downtrodden while offering mere simplistic chastisement; a time where charity is given reluctantly, and "Hearne's visits to the O'Neill family are a convenient social arrangement that's gone on so long that no-one can quite remember the original point".

The soundtrack by Delerue, composed for an ensemble of for strings, flute, oboe, two clarinets, three horns and two harps, with church organ, was released on LP and CD in 1988 on the AVM label, with Martin Jones playing the Chopin Prelude in E minor op.28 no.4, and the Trio Zingara playing the Mozart Trio in G K.564 and the Chopin prelude arranged for piano trio by Robert Matthew-Walker.

== Release ==
The film was released in the United States by Island Pictures on 23 December 1987. The film was due to be released in London on 18 November 1988 by Virgin Film Distributors followed by a nationwide release in the United Kingdom, however, The Cannon Group informed Virgin on 4 November that they would not screen the film in its cinemas due to a dispute with HandMade Films, who they claimed owed them £1.6 million in advances and guarantees and had not fulfilled certain commitments. The film's UK release was postponed indefinitely, however, the Tyneside Cinema in Newcastle upon Tyne had previously arranged to release the film from 21 November 1988 for three weeks and went ahead with their release. The film was eventually released in London on 6 January 1989.

== Reception ==
Pauline Kael wrote that "Clayton is a felicitous choice to direct a character study film about a woman's rage against the Church for her wasted life. His first feature was Room at the Top with Simone Signoret and he made The Innocents with Deborah Kerr and The Pumpkin Eater with Anne Bancroft – he knows how to show women's temperatures and their mind-body inter-actions. Maggie Smith becomes the essence of spinster – she makes you feel the ghastliness of knowing you're a figure of fun." Janet Maslin, writing in The New York Times, called the film "ponderous" and "literal" and thought the novel far superior to the film's "awkward" screenplay. She praised much of the acting, but thought Bob Hoskins was "paralyzed by the crude Americanism of his character".

== Awards ==
Maggie Smith won the British Academy Film Award for Best Actress. She also won the Evening Standard British Film Award for Best Actress (tying with Billie Whitelaw for The Dressmaker). Bob Hoskins won the Best Actor award (also for Who Framed Roger Rabbit).
