= Áine Ní Mhuirí =

Irish actress

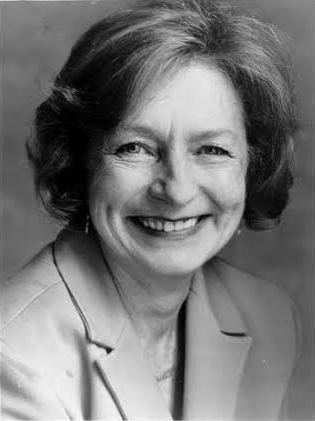

Áine Ní Mhuirí (born Dublin, Ireland) is an Irish actress. She began her career at the Damer Theatre, later working in the Abbey Theatre. Áine is a fluent Irish language speaker.

== Career ==
In 1975, she appeared in a play by Irish playwright Teresa Deevy called Katie Roche, where she played the part of Margaret Drybone.

She appeared in the 1987 film The Lonely Passion of Judith Hearne, based on the novel by Brian Moore.

In 1989, she played Masie Madigan in the London National Theatre production of Juno and the Paycock.

She played Lily in the Irish Soap Opera Fair City on RTÉ One.

In 2001, Mhuirí won the CFT Excellence Award for Best Actress in a Television Series for her role as Kathleen Hendley in Ballykissangel. She appeared in 53 episodes, from 1996 to 2001.

In 2012, Áine appeared in Pan Pan Theatre Company's production of Ibsen's A Doll House at Smock Alley Theatre.

She played Mrs. Taylor in several of the Jack Taylor, an Irish television drama based on a series of novels by Ken Bruen, including The Magdalen Martyrs (2011), and The Dramatist (2013).

Áine Ní Mhuirí is scheduled to play in Embers, a theatricalized presentation of a radio play by Samuel Beckett, staged by the Pan Pan Theatre Company at the Brooklyn Academy of Music in September 2015.

== Filmography ==
=== Film ===
Year	Title	Role	Notes
1987	The Lonely Passion of Judith Hearne	Edie Marinan	
1990	The Field	Priest's Housekeeper	
1992	The Playboys	Mrs. Smith the Blind Lady	
1995	The Run of the Country	Dannys Aunt	
1998	The Brylcreem Boys	Nonie	
2002	Puckoon	Madam Grinns	
2003	Blind Flight	Brian's Mum	
2015	Brooklyn	Mrs Byrne	
2019	End of Sentence	Dolores	

=== Television ===
Year	Title	Role	Notes
1967	Ó Dúill	Una	Miniseries
1971	Mr Joyce is Leaving Paris	Nora / Lucia Joyce	Television film
1972	An Carabhan	Neillí	Television film
1978	Teems of Times	Kathleen Behan	Television film
1979	The Burke Enigma	Deirdre Burke	Episode: "Misadventure or Murder?"
1982	The Lost Hour	Bridget	Television film
1984	The Irish R.M.	Mrs. McEvoy	Episode: "The Dispensary Doctor"
1985	Cúirt An Mheán Oíche	Aoibheal	Television film
1985	The Price	Maire	4 episodes
1986	Screen Two	Elizabeth	Episode: "Time After Time"
1988	Echoes	Agnes O'Brien	4 episodes
1989	Fair City	Lily Corcoran	Episode #1.1
1990	The Lilac Bus	Mrs. Burke	Television film
1996–2001	Ballykissangel	Kathleen Hendley	53 episodes
1998	Alice auf der Flucht	Alma's Mother	Miniseries
2010	Jack Taylor	Mrs. Taylor	4 episodes
2013, 2014	Scúp	Old Woman in Taxi 2 / Mrs. McDermott	2 episodes
2014	My Whole Half Life	Grace	Episode: "Between Heaven and Here"
2014	Quirke	Maggie	Episode: "The Silver Swan"
2016	Éirí Amach Amú	Agnes Timmons	Episode #1.1
2017	Broken	Michael's Mother	5 episodes
2018	Blood	Rita	3 episodes
