= Sensitive skin =

Skin condition prone to irritation

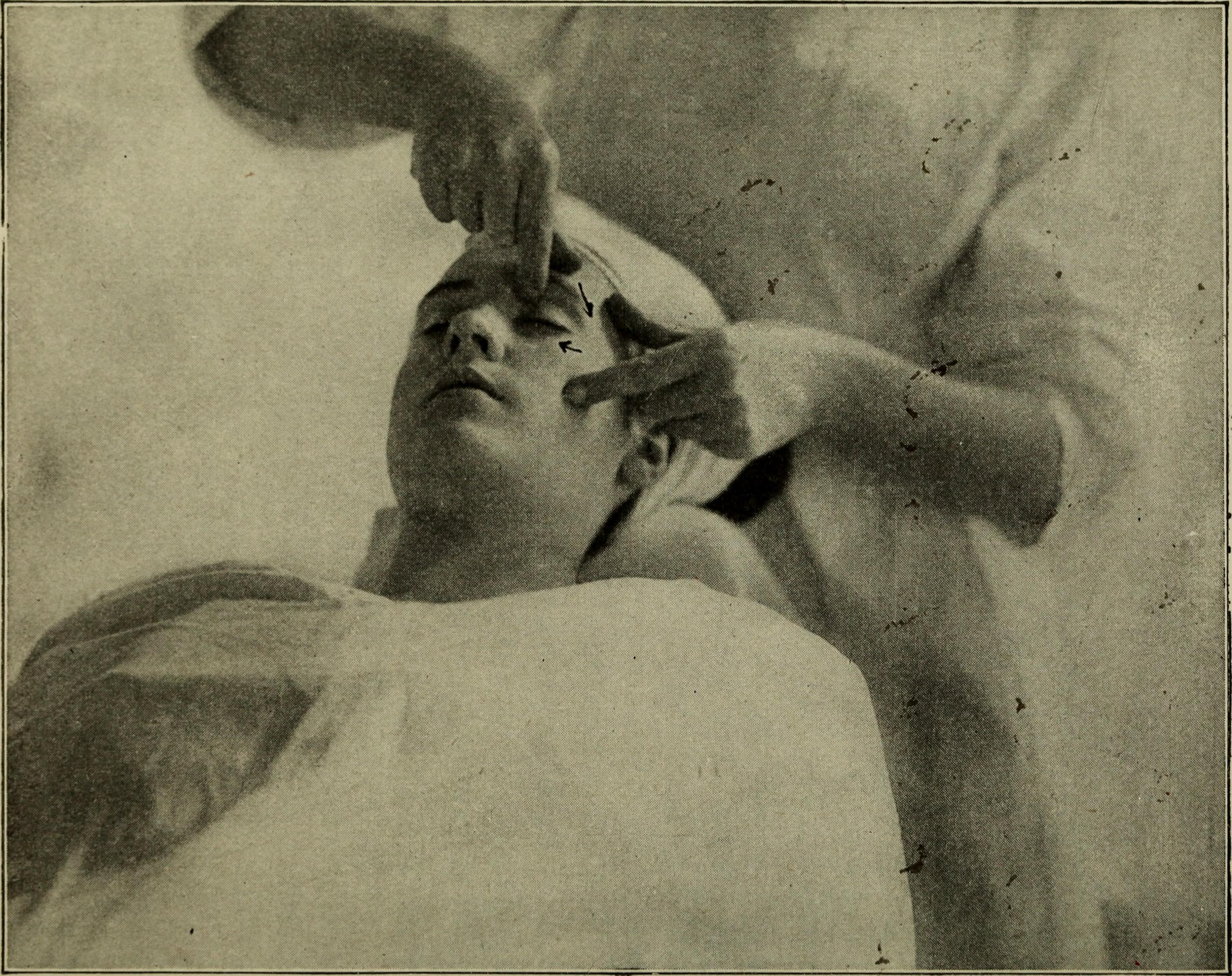
A 1914 photograph for Emily Lloyd's dermatology book detailing the benefits of massage for all skin types; the c. 1870 text reads, "Extremely sensitive skins sometimes become irritated under even the lightest treatment but these are exceptions to the rule."

Sensitive skin is a dermatological condition when there is sensitivity of the skin that can cause dryness, itching, burning, and/or other dermatological conditions, due to irritants. The irritation felt with sensitive skin can often be derived from environment, a weakened skin barrier, or chemicals, within products such as cosmetics and toiletries. Sensitive skin can be diagnosed especially when other skin concerns arise, though some also self-diagnose if they find themselves easily irritated by the factors around them. Many dermatologists believe that the best route of treatment is to avoid factors that can cause irritation, such as certain products, and/or by taking products that target inflammation. Researchers have investigated improving the skin barrier through methods of consuming foods high in probiotics and vitamins.

== Epidemiology ==
As researchers and dermatologists look into the cause of sensitive skin, they also examine its prevalence among populations from gender to age to nationalities. This can help researchers to examine if there are common triggers that may occur more commonly in some areas versus others. Some researchers have discussed that the concept of sensitive skin has increased in the industrialized world, suggesting that some sensitivity can stem from factors of industrialization.

=== Sex ===
When questioned, in a study published in 2001, over 50% of women in the UK and US, and 38% of men, report that they have sensitive skin. In a study later published in 2009 in the US within the city of Cincinnati, 64% of men in the study and 69% of women claimed sensitive skin. It is possible that women are more susceptible to sensitive skin than men as women are more susceptible to inflammation due to hormonal differences and men may have a thicker skin barrier than women. However, some researchers have noted a potential correlation between marketing and declaring sensitive skin; suggesting that when marketing increased for sensitive skin products, there was an increase in claiming the condition.

=== Age ===
Though not a lot of significant studies exist on whether age affects skin sensitivity, some scientists today believe that the skin does reduce functioning with age advancement which could increase sensitivity. Which causes many scientists to believe that older adults may experience skin sensitivity as they reach their 40s and 50s. However, there is not enough research available to fully support the claim that age can factor into sensitive skin.

=== Nationality ===
Many studies also track nationalities when surveying for the prevalence of dry skin. This is often due to examining whether regions have certain environmental factors (such as more industrialized areas) or may regulate products differently and could cause for an increase or decrease in prevalence in sensitive skin. Throughout the European population 39% state that they experience sensitive skin. In a study published in 1992, across Japan, the United States, and Europe, sampled 150,000 women and men and 30% of the men and 50% of the women claimed that they had sensitive skin. Some other studies have examined France and England's percentage of sampled people claiming sensitive skin from 2000 to 2008 and found that 50% or over tended to claim sensitive skin. Some researchers (Farage and Maibach 2010) have suggested that this could be due to continuously industrializing countries, but also with the concept of sensitive skin becoming mainstream and being claimed, suggesting a potential psychological case paired with a physiological one.

== Classification ==
Sensitive skin is often the cause of a weakened skin barrier that is triggered by an outside factor. This factor can cause the skin to react within contact or after repeated contact. There are a few ways skin sensitivity can be classified.

Some studies that examine classifying sensitive skin are based on skin barrier functioning and the skin's reaction. One way is to list the skin as Type I or Type II. In Type I, the skin's barrier function is low, but there is no other dermatological condition. Type II refers to normal barrier function, but it is followed by signs of inflammation. Type III entails that there is also normal skin barrier functioning, though there is no inflammation, but the skin overreacts and causes sensations of itching, burning, or other similar sensations.

Eczema is often a common form of inflammation stemming from sensitive skin.

Some researchers also believe that there are different stimuli of sensitivity when it comes to sensitive skin. Some people may be more sensitive to cosmetics, some more sensitive to environmental factors, while others may have higher sensitivity and be sensitive to both internal and external factors of the body.

Some dermatologists also believe that there are two forms of sensitive skin symptoms. The first is called the subjective form or primary sensitive skin which is sensitive skin without any underlying skin condition. The second classification is known as the secondary or the objective form of sensitive skin which is when the patient does experience a skin condition along with sensitive skin such as, but not limited to acne, rosacea, or eczema.

== Symptoms ==
Symptoms often vary from person to person, as well as varying levels of severity. Common symptoms of sensitive skin include itching, rashes, and burning sensations. It may often be accompanied by frequent irritation of the skin, easy irritation from change in or extreme weather, or a cosmetic product causing a negative effect to the skin and its sensation.

Often, the skin barrier is weakened which may result in sensitive skin and with a weak barrier that is unable to prevent that irritation, it is common for the skin to be more susceptible to other skin conditions. Or currently existing skin conditions or continuous exposure to certain conditions, such as certain products, can often be a cause for the skin being more prone to irritation from various factors.

== Causes ==
=== Family history ===
Sensitive skin, and conditions that might be more common occurring with sensitive skin, such as atopic dermatitis, are believed to have a genetic correlation. In a study that compared 25 women, 76% of them stated that they had a parent with the same condition. This study noted that it was more common for those with sensitive skin to find a family member with the same condition versus their non-sensitive counterparts.

=== Weak skin barrier ===
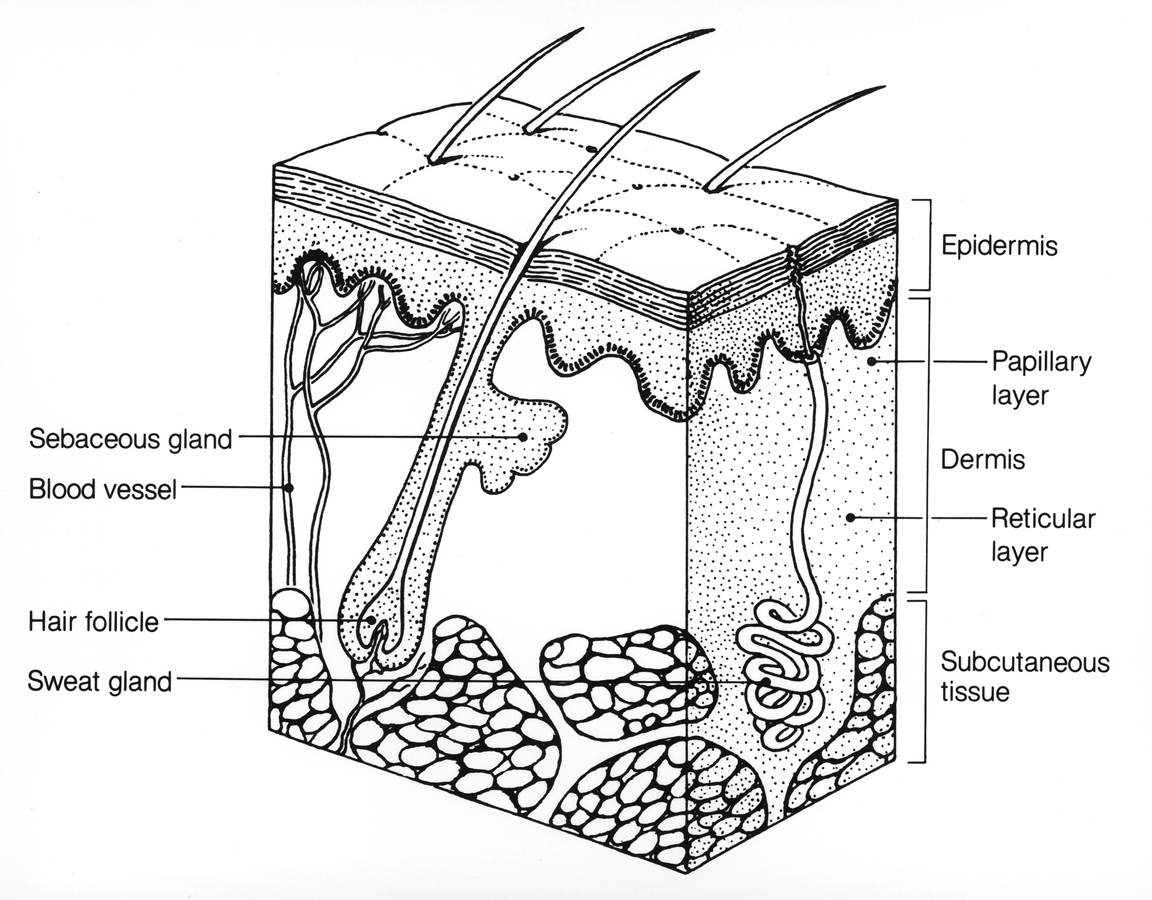
Sensitive skin is often tied to skin barrier function.

Another common cause dermatologists believe for sensitive skin is a weakened skin barrier. Skin barrier also refers to epidermal barrier which contains multiple barriers of the skin. Researchers believe that a main cause for sensitive skin can be derived from disruption, thinness, or decreased hydration in the stratum corneum. This outer layer of the epidermis is considered a part of the permeability barrier that is in charge of holding water, creating various lipids, responding to inflammation, or blocking out irritants. When that area is weakened, dermatologists note it can often be easier for individuals to be more susceptible to sensitivity in the skin.

=== Environmental factors ===
Weather can play a role in sensitive skin sensations as well. Individuals that may experience colder climates might face heightened sensitivity periods due to dehydration of the stratum corneum. This sensation of irritation is often increased when that first layer of the skin is weakened due to external factors making it easier for the skin to become drier and more susceptible to that sensitivity.

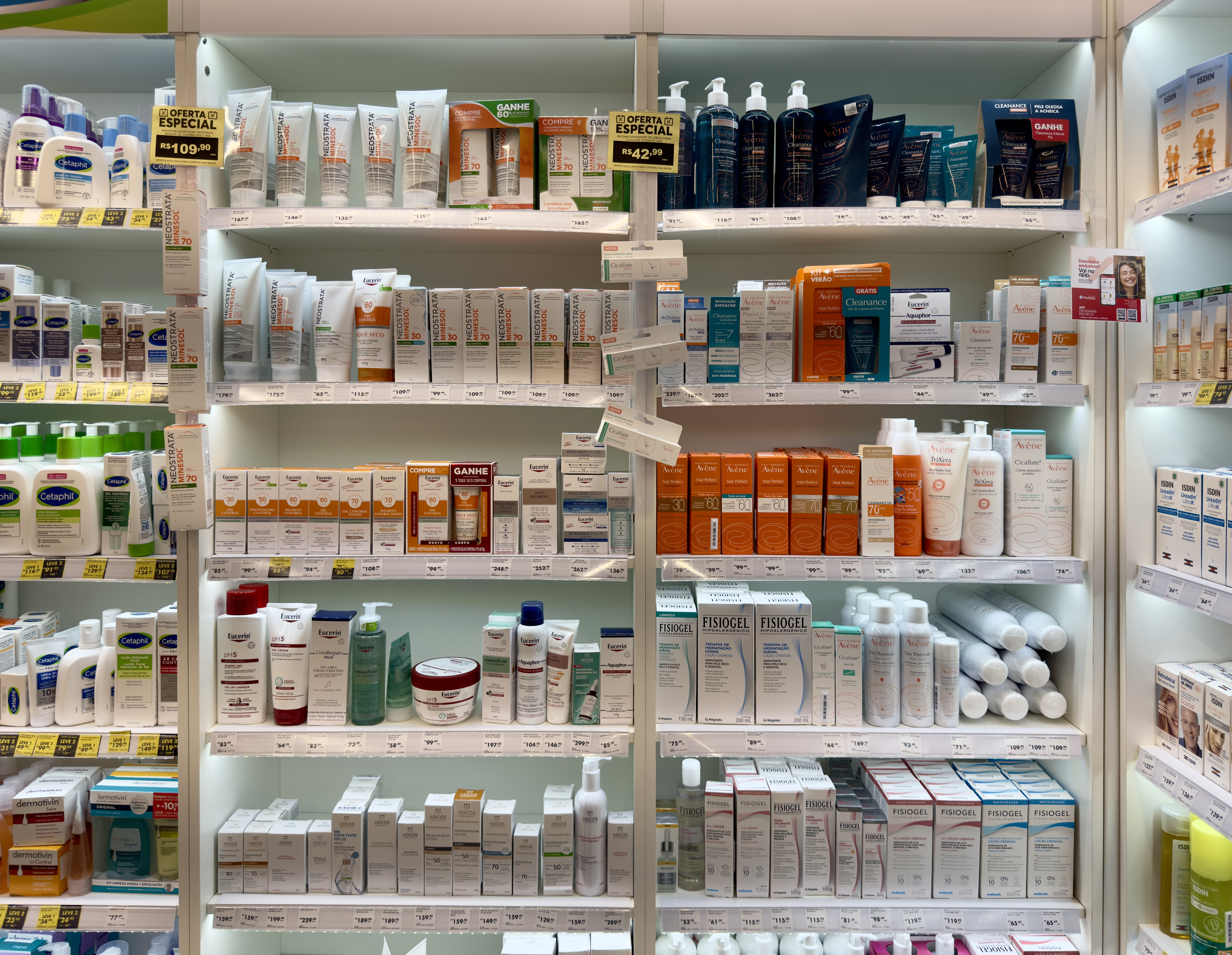
Skin care products can sometimes contain irritants for those with sensitive skin.

=== Skin care products ===
As it so happens, it is possible that skin care products may also play a role in increasing susceptibility to sensitive skin. This is due to the skin barrier becoming weakened due to certain products in the ingredients or an increased dependency on the product, preventing the skin from properly functioning. Additionally, some products may contain chemicals that do cause irritation to the skin, and can especially be the case if the skin barrier cannot block out those irritants.

=== Other factors to consider ===
Researchers have also examined and considered other potential factors for why sensitive skin may be combined by analyzing results of those that claimed the condition. Sometimes natural elements of the skin, such as a lighter pigmentation and susceptibility to sunburning can be also be more susceptible to sensitive skin. Researchers believe that hormones and current inflammation can also be reason for sensitive skin. Those who currently have a skin condition may have an already weakened skin barrier which some researchers have suggested may be the cause for increased sensitive skin due to weaker skin barrier.

== Diagnosis ==
One way of classifying skin sensitivity and thus moving towards diagnosing it is utilizing Roberts Skin Type Classification. This involves a comprehensive look into patient and ancestral history, examining the skin both visually and physically, and testing the reaction of the sensitive skin area. It is just one way of classifying the skin for a complete and individualized diagnosis.

A route of diagnosing presented by Primavera and Berardesca, a patient for sensitive skin is often started by examining if there is a current underlying dermatological condition. If the preexisting condition is present, the skin will be treated for that condition more specifically. If there is no current condition, a physical exam will be completed, and diagnosed as having secondary sensitive skin, or sensitive skin that leads to visible inflammation on skin (see section on Classification). If there is no skin condition already in play, rather a tingling, itching, burning, or similar sensations, it should be checked if they are derived from cosmetic or environmental factors. If it proves there is sensitive skin present after a physical exam in this case, the patient would be diagnosed with a primary form of sensitive skin, as there is no outward signs of inflammation.

Moisturizer can help people with sensitive skin that might experience dry skin or other topical effects.

== Treatment ==
Since sensitive skin is often due to a weakened skin barrier, many dermatologists recommend using cleansers and moisturizers that may help to strengthen the skin barrier.

Treatment prescribed by physicians often varies on severity for patients. When diagnosed, dermatologists may use a medical route if there is a pre-existing skin condition where the need for pharmacology or physical therapy is necessary. However, if the patient is experiencing more of a sensational effect from sensitive skin, they may be directed to smaller changes such as diet, lifestyle, or product usage such as avoiding common allergens. If there is no improvement, from there treatment can progress to attempting to use a cleansing routine with certain products to help the skin, or to limit product usage of certain products and use products with ingredients targeted at reducing inflammation.

One product commonly considered beneficial in products for reducing sensitive skin is neurosensine, noted by researchers to reduce inflammation by simulating endorphins and helping to strengthen the skin barrier through keratinocytes and strengthening nerve fibers. It is often used to inhibit neurosensorial inflammation, or the irritation that comes from the sensations in neurons that cause the irritation.

== Research ==
Much research on the topic examines improving the skin barrier in order to help reduce sensitivity to factors that result in the irritation of skin. Research also continues to be done on the prevalence of sensitive skin in age groups, geography, and gender.

=== Skin barrier research and fermented dairy products ===
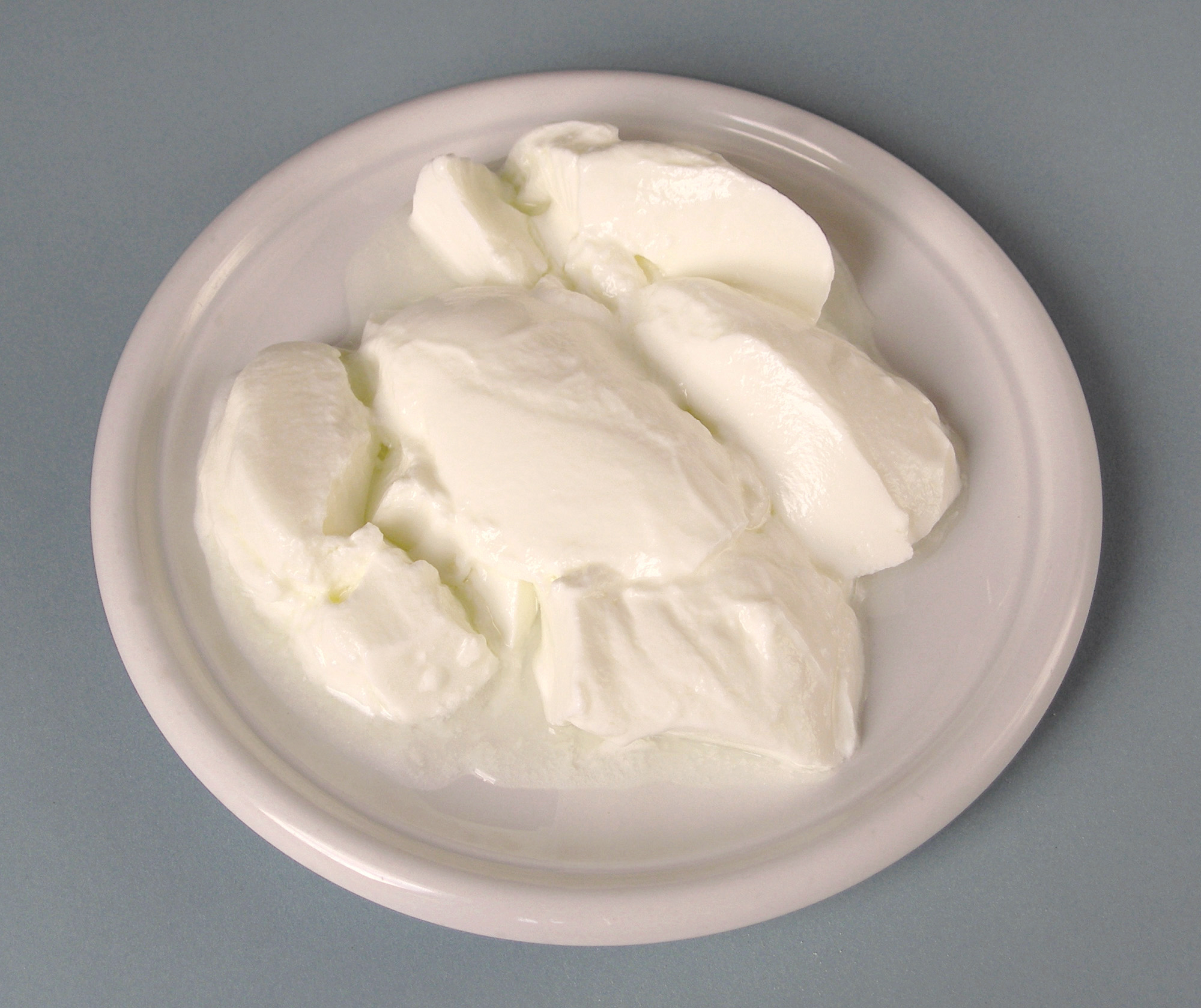
Researchers are testing the effects of fermented dairy products, such as yogurt, due to high probiotic level.

This study looked into if it was possible to improve skin function through consumption and if there would be a large enough effect on skin. They tested a fermented milk product which included vitamin E, borage oil, green tea, and many probiotics. The study first examined bioavailability with a small group of women to make sure that the food could be digested and on what levels. Next, the study moved on to an efficacy study to see if, with every other aspect controlled, a larger group of 72 women would see results from the change in diet. The study concluded that after roughly 6 weeks, there were women that began to see a clinically significant improvement in skin function (with a p-value under 0.05). Though it did take some time, however for some participants to see results, the most significant and far out result of a skin barrier improvement occur at 18 weeks after consumption of fermented milk began.

== See also ==
- Contact dermatitis
- List of cutaneous conditions
