= British Egg Industry Council =

Organisation representing the British egg industry

- Predecessor: Egg Marketing Board
- Formation: 1986
- Purpose: To represent the British egg industry
- Members: 11 organisations (2014)
- Official language: English

The British Egg Industry Council is an organisation set up in 1986 to represent the British egg industry. It currently has 11 member organisations, including the British Egg Products Association, the National Farmers Union and the British Free Range Egg Producers Association (BFREPA). The BEIC operates the British Egg Information Service, which promotes the consumption of eggs to the public.

== Lion Mark ==

The main marketing activity of the British Egg Information Service is the Lion Quality Mark scheme. This is a mark that can be stamped onto eggs by producers who are signed up to its Lion Quality Code of Practice. The code of practice requires that all laying hens must be vaccinated against Salmonella enteritidis and also places certain welfare, feeding, traceability and freshness standards upon producers. The Lion Mark however is not necessarily a sign that the eggs are organic or free range. As of 2009, the British Egg Information Service claims that 84% of eggs produced in the UK are produced to Lion standards.

== See also ==
- Egg Marketing Board - Predecessor to the BEIC and the initial creator of the Lion Mark.
