= Len Fulford =

Leonard Fulford
- Born: Leonard Alfred Fulford; 11 November 1928
- Died: 27 November 2011 (aged 83); Friston, Suffolk, England
- Known for: Commercial photography
- Style: Still life

Leonard Alfred Fulford (11 November 1928 – 27 November 2011) was a British commercial photographer and director, with a specialty for photography of still life. He was one of the founding members of BFCS. With studios in London, New York, Los Angeles and Milan, BFCS was one of the most successful commercial production companies of all time, winning the Palme d'Or at the Cannes Advertising Festival six times. Fulford directed the popular Go to work on an egg television commercials for the Egg Marketing Board during the 1960s. Fulford also directed many of the iconic Guinness television commercials of the 1970s and 1980s, along with other memorable spots like the Courage Best 'Rabbit Rabbit' commercial, and the iconic Simple skincare commercial in which robotic arms spray a pristine white lily with colouring and perfume.

His work earned him awards and recognition. The famous "Go to work on an egg" television ad campaign which he directed earned him the nickname "the eggman" within the industry.

Len Fulford retired in 1995, and lived in East Anglia. He died in Friston, Suffolk, on 27 November 2011, at the age of 83. He is survived by three sons. His wife, the former Gillian Fox, whom he married in 1953, died in 2007.
