= Denis O'Brien (producer) =

American lawyer and movie producer (1941–2021)

- Born: 12 September 1941; St. Louis
- Died: 3 December 2021; Swindon
- Education: Webster Groves High School, Northwestern University, Washington University in St. Louis

Denis O'Brien (September 12, 1941 – December 3, 2021) was an American attorney, best known as the business manager of George Harrison and co-founder of the film studio HandMade Films.

== Biography ==
O'Brien was born on September 12, 1941, and grew up in St. Louis, Missouri, the son of Ruth O'Brien and Albert James O'Brien. Albert was Vice chairman of the board at Ralston Purina, and also chairman of the board of Union Bank of Illinois, Union Illinois Company, and the State Bank of Jerseyville, Illinois, a bank that he gained control of in 1974. Denis became President and CEO of the bank in 1997, but was ousted two years later by the bank's board "after his business strategy proved too aggressive for the board of directors".

O'Brien attended Northwestern University and earned a JD from Washington University School of Law. He lived in Paris from 1968-70, where he worked for the prestigious law firm Coudert Frères. He then moved to London for a position with the Rothschild banking group. His two daughters by his first wife, Kristen and Laura O'Brien, were born in London. In 1995 he married British artist Phyllida Riddell.

O'Brien met George Harrison when the former Beatle was looking to extricate himself from Allen Klein's management. He was introduced to Harrison by Peter Sellers, one of the financial clients O'Brien successfully helped by turning around his flailing career in 1974 when Sellers signed on to make The Return of the Pink Panther. O'Brien helped the former Beatle sort out his mounting tax issues after becoming his manager in 1973. Their partnership was initially founded on mutual admiration. Harrison said of O'Brien, "In 20 minutes, he gets more from a budget sheet than most people do in 20 hours", while O'Brien recalled of their first meeting: "The chairman of Shell, of RTZ, of IBM, of Ford – I've met all these people and I've never met anyone as together as George."

Harrison and O'Brien founded the film production company HandMade Films in 1978 to finance the completion of Monty Python's Life of Brian after EMI Films, the original backers, pulled out at the last moment. O'Brien ran HandMade Films, as well as acting as executive producer for Life of Brian, and later productions such as The Long Good Friday, Time Bandits, The Missionary, Mona Lisa, Withnail and I and Nuns on the Run. The company ceased operations in 1991 and was sold three years later to Paragon Entertainment, a Canadian corporation.

Harrison brought a lawsuit against O'Brien in Los Angeles in January 1995, claiming O'Brien had deprived him of £16 million over a 12-year period. The court found that O'Brien had mismanaged HandMade and ruled that he should pay Harrison $11 million. He was subsequently instructed to pay Harrison £6.7 million in damages. Harrison felt betrayed by O'Brien, whom he considered a close family friend. O'Brien felt equally betrayed and hurt by Harrison and the turn of events.

O'Brien filed for bankruptcy, while Harrison sued O'Brien in bankruptcy court without success. In August 2001, the judge dismissed the case because Harrison failed to appear for a deposition, and also dismissed Harrison's claim that his poor health had prevented him from doing so. Harrison died of lung cancer three months later on November 29, 2001. However, according to The New York Times, "In a rare interview, with The Belleville News-Democrat of Illinois in 1996, Mr. O'Brien, who lived in the St. Louis area at the time, gave his own interpretation. "As long as we were successful, we had a wonderful relationship," he said of Mr. Harrison. "The money is not the important aspect here," he added. "It wouldn’t make any difference if it were a dollar or a million dollars. It's George not knowing how to accept failure or take responsibility for it."

O'Brien died on December 3, 2021, in Wiltshire, England at the age of 80. His obituary in the New York Times quoted former screenwriters who embraced working with O'Brien and the role he played in developing their careers. "The screenwriter Stephen Rivele (“Ali,” “Nixon”), who with his writing partner, Chris Wilkinson, wrote seven scripts for Handmade in its later years (though none were produced), said his experience with Mr. O’Brien had been positive. "On every draft, he gave careful, handwritten notes, which were always as perceptive as they were polite," Mr. Rivele said by email. "He had very keen insights and original ideas which invariably made the scripts better."
