= Puffball (disambiguation) =

A puffball is a type of fungi.

Puffball may also refer to:

- The seeding flower head of a dandelion
- Puffball (novel), a 1980 supernatural novel by Fay Weldon
- Puffball (film), a 2007 British film adaptation of the novel
- Puffball, a character from the second season of Battle for Dream Island, an animated web series
- Puffball Collective, a Marvel Comics group
- Puffball Islands, a group of Antarctic islands

== See also ==
- Caenocara, a beetle genus, some species of which are known as puffball beetles
