= Once You Meet a Stranger =

1996 American film

- Genre: Thriller
- Based on: Strangers on a Train by; Raymond Chandler; Czenzi Ormonde; Whitfield Cook; Strangers on a Train by Patricia Highsmith
- Teleplay by: Raymond Chandler; Czenzi Ormonde; Tommy Lee Wallace
- Story by: Whitfield Cook
- Directed by: Tommy Lee Wallace
- Starring: Jacqueline Bisset; Theresa Russell; Mimi Kennedy; Celeste Holm; Richard Doyle
- Music by: Peter Manning Robinson
- Country of origin: United States
- Original language: English

Production
- Executive producer: Michael Filerman
- Producer: Phil Parslow
- Cinematography: Steven Poster
- Editor: Paul Dixon
- Running time: 96 minutes
- Production companies: Michael Filerman Productions; Warner Bros. Television

Original release
- Network: CBS
- Release: September 25, 1996

Once You Meet a Stranger is a 1996 American thriller television film directed by Tommy Lee Wallace. It is a remake of Alfred Hitchcock's 1951 film Strangers on a Train, based on the 1950 novel by Patricia Highsmith. In the remake, the genders of the principal characters have been switched from male to female. It stars Jacqueline Bisset and Theresa Russell, and it premiered on CBS on September 25, 1996.

== Plot ==
A fading actress, Sheila, finds consolation in a stranger, Margo, during her train journey. Sheila tells Margo of her desire to divorce her husband, and in turn Margo shares her hatred for her domineering mother. They jokingly suggest performing a murder on each other's behalf. But all too soon the joke becomes reality.

== Cast ==
- Jacqueline Bisset as Sheila Gaines
- Theresa Russell as Margo Anthony
- Mimi Kennedy as Connie
- Celeste Holm as Clara
- Richard Doyle as Mr. Anthony
- Robert Desiderio as Andy Stahl
- Kathryne Dora Brown as Skeptic
- Nick Mancuso as Aaron

== See also ==
- Remakes of films by Alfred Hitchcock
