= Selwyn Jepson =

British writer (1899–1989)

Selwyn Jepson (25 November 1899 – 10 March 1989) was an English mystery and detective author and screenwriter. He was the son of the fiction writer Edgar Jepson (1863–1938) and Frieda Holmes, daughter of the musician Henry Holmes. His sister Margaret (1907–2003) was also a novelist and the mother of the author Fay Weldon. Jepson was the recruiting officer for the clandestine Special Operations Executive (SOE) during World War II.

== Youth and SOE Service ==
Jepson was born in Bloomsbury and educated at St Paul's School, London and the Sorbonne. He served in the Tank Corps during World War I and in the clandestine Special Operations Executive (SOE) in World War II. In 1942 and 1943, he was the recruiting officer for F section which infiltrated agents into France to foment opposition to Nazi occupation of the country.

Prime Minister Winston Churchill created SOE to "set Europe ablaze." Jepson's job was to find the people to accomplish that task. SOE was an unconventional organization and Jepson recruited a wide variety of people to become agents in France. The most important qualification was to speak French fluently enough to pass as a native of France. The "old boy network" generated most recruits, but some were found in odd ways. For example, Marguerite Knight was recruited after she was heard speaking French at a party.

Jepson met potential agents in a bare room, usually in the Victoria Hotel in London. He conducted the interview in French and in the initial interview gave no indication of what the job was. If positive, he conducted a second interview in an apartment at Orchard Court with a black marble bathroom that became famous as an SOE meeting place. At that second interview, he told the recruit that, if accepted, they would be sent to occupied France, although he didn't detail the duties they would have. He also advised them that their chances of survival were about 50 percent. (In fact, of about 470 F section agents sent to France, 117 were killed.) Jepson told his recruits, "I have to decide whether I can risk your life and you have to decide whether you're willing to risk it."

Known only to a few during the war, Jepson recruited women as SOE agents. Government officials argued whether or not it was illegal to use women in hazardous positions. Jepson, when interviewed by the Imperial War Museum, stated:

I was responsible for recruiting women for the work, in the face of a good deal of opposition, I may say, from the powers that be. In my view, women were very much better than men for the work. Women, as you must know, have a far greater capacity for cool and lonely courage than men. Men usually want a mate with them. Men don't work alone, their lives tend to be always in company with other men. There was opposition from most quarters until it went up to Churchill, whom I had met before the war. He growled at me, "What are you doing?" I told him and he said, "I see you are using women to do this," and I said, "Yes, don't you think it is a very sensible thing to do?" and he said, "Yes, good luck to you." That was my authority!"

The advantages of recruiting women became apparent with experience. Women were the best couriers because they had more mobility than men in France and could more easily pose as traveling nurses or salesmen. Young French men were subject to being enlisted by force in the Service du travail obligatoire (STO) and transported to Germany to work in factories. Women were also less likely to attract the suspicion of German soldiers and French policemen. Jepson recruited more than 50 women to work in occupied Europe. Of 39 women Jepson recruited to serve as SOE agents in France, 11 were captured and executed by the Germans. Two more died.

Illustrating the deceptiveness of SOE, Jepson never gave his name to the recruits, and interviewed them while wearing several different military uniforms "to which he was not entitled." His real rank and military affiliation was as "a major in the Buffs".

== Author ==
Jepson became a well-known mystery/detective author and screenwriter, best known for Keep Murder Quiet (1940), the "Eve Gill" ingénue sleuth novel series, and other non-series novels:

- The Qualified Adventurer (1922)
- Puppets of Fate (1922)
- Golden-Eyes (1922), US title The Sutton Papers
- That Fellow MacArthur (1923)
- The King's Red-Haired Girl (1923)
- Rogues and Diamonds (1925)
- Snaggletooth (1926)
- The Death Gong (1927)
- Love and Helen (1928)
- Tiger Dawn (1929)
- I Met Murder (1930)
- Rabbit's Paw (1932) US title The Mystery of the Rabbit's Paw
- Heads and Tails (1933) short story collection
- Love in Peril (1934)
- The Wise Fool (1934)
- Riviera Love Story (1948)
- Man Running (1948), as Outrun the Constable in the US. In 1950, it was published in paperback as Killer by Proxy
- Tempering Steel (1949)
- Man Dead (1951)
- The Assassin (1956)
- A Noise in the Night (1957)
- The Third Possibility (1965)
- The Angry Millionaire (1968)
- Letter to a Dead Girl (1971)

== Screenwriter and director ==
- For Love of You (1933) screenwriter
- Money Mad (1934) screenwriter
- Kiss Me Goodbye (1935) screenwriter
- Hyde Park Corner (1935) screenwriter
- The Love Test (1935) screenwriter
- The Riverside Murder (1935) screenwriter
- Toilers of the Sea (1936) director, screenwriter
- Well Done, Henry (1936) screenwriter
- Wedding Group (1936) screenwriter
- The Scarab Murder Case (1936) screenwriter
- Sailing Along (1938) screenwriter
- The Red Dress (1954) screenwriter
- The Last Moment (1954) screenwriter
- Forever My Heart (1954) screenwriter

=== Film adaptation ===
The Alfred Hitchcock film Stage Fright (1950) was based on Selwyn Jepson's 1948 novel Man Running (also published as Outrun the Constable and Killer by Proxy). It was adapted for the screen by Whitfield Cook and Hitchcock's wife and frequent collaborator Alma Reville, with additional dialogue by James Bridie and Ranald MacDougall.

== Television ==
Selwyn Jepson had many pieces converted for broadcast by the BBC. BBC archival material exists for their productions of The Golden Dart and The Hungry Spider is held by the Mausoleum Club.

== Private life ==
For his private use, Selwyn Jepson built the Far House, Farther Common, Liss, Hampshire.
