= Maggie Alderson =

British author, magazine editor and fashion journalist

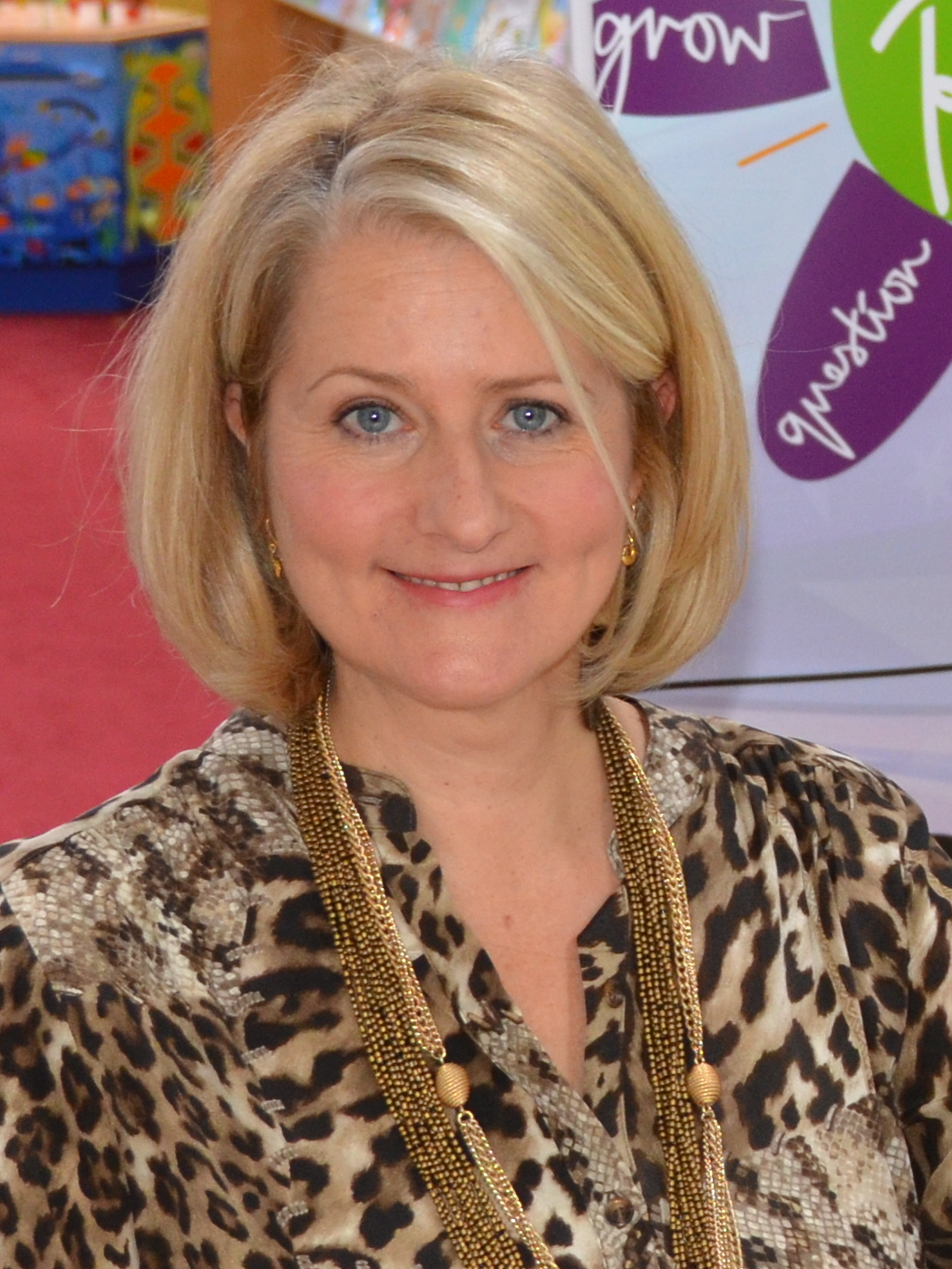
- Alderson in 2012
- Born: 1959 (age 66–67); London, United Kingdom
- Citizenship: British; Australian
- Education: University of St Andrews (MA)
- Occupations: Author, magazine editor, fashion journalist
- Children: 1

Maggie Alderson (born 1959) is a British author, magazine editor and fashion journalist. She is the former editor of ES, the Evening Standard magazine (British Society of Magazine Editors, Editor of the Year, Colour Supplements 1989) and British Elle magazines. In Australia, she was acting editor of Cleo and editor of Mode.

== Early life and education ==
Alderson was born in London. She earned a Master of Arts degree in Art History from the University of St Andrews.

== Career ==
Alderson was a reporter for Fleet Street in the 1980s.

In 1996, she joined the Sydney Morning Herald as a Senior Writer and for many years covered the fashion shows in Paris, Milan and London for the paper. Her weekly fashion and style column appeared in Good Weekend (the Saturday magazine of the Sydney Morning Herald and The Age newspapers) for over ten years. She has also had a similar column in The Times, in the UK.

On 4 November 2010, it was announced that Alderson's column would no longer be appearing in Good Weekend.

The internationally bestselling Girls Night In "chick lit" anthology series she co-edited with author Jessica Adams and columnist Imogen Edwards-Jones raised over £1 million for the charity War Child.

She was co-editor, with Jessica Adams, Imogen Edwards-Jones and Kathy Lette, of In Bed With, a collection of erotic short stories written by female novelists (Fay Weldon, Joanne Harris, Ali Smith, Esther Freud, Justine Picardie, among others).

== Personal life ==
She lived in Sydney for eight years and also holds Australian citizenship. She is married with one daughter.

== Novels ==
- Pants on Fire (2000)
- Mad About the Boy (2002)
- Handbags and Gladrags (2004)
- Cents and Sensibility (2006)
- How to Break Your Own Heart (2008)
- Shall We Dance (2010)
- Evangeline: The Wish Keeper's Helper (2011)
- Everything Changes But You (2012)
- Secret Keeping for Beginners (2015)
- The Scent of You (2017)

== Non-fiction ==
- Shoe Money (1998)
- Handbag Heaven (2001)
- Gravity Sucks (2007)
- Style Notes (2011)
