= Alecia McKenzie =

Jamaican writer and journalist

- Born: 1962 (age 63–64); Kingston, Jamaica
- Education: Troy University; Columbia University
- Occupations: Writer and journalist
- Awards: Commonwealth Writers Prize

Alecia McKenzie (born 1962) is a Jamaican writer, editor, painter and journalist born in Kingston, Jamaica and currently based in France.

== Life ==
McKenzie studied at Alpha Academy in Kingston, Troy University in Alabama, and Columbia University in New York, focusing on languages, art and journalism. At Troy University, she was the first Jamaican editor of the student newspaper, The Tropolitan, and graduated summa cum laude.

She has worked for various international news organizations and has taught Communications at the Vrije Universiteit Brussel. Besides Jamaica, she has lived in the United States, Belgium, England and Singapore and now mainly shares her time between France, where she is based with her family, and the Caribbean.

== Writing career ==
McKenzie's first collection of short stories, Satellite City, won the regional Commonwealth Writers Prize for Best First Book (Canada and the Caribbean). Her second book, When the Rain Stopped in Natland, is a novella for young readers, and has been included on the literacy program in several schools.

That was followed by a novella for teenagers, Doctor’s Orders, which is a part-adventure, part-detective story, with mostly teenage characters, set in the Caribbean; and a second collection of stories, Stories from Yard, first published in its Italian translation, and by Peepal Tree Press in 2005. Her fifth book, Sweetheart, a novel, was on 21 May 2012 announced as the Caribbean regional winner of the Commonwealth Book Prize 2012. The French translation of Sweetheart (Trésor) won the Prix Carbet des lycéens in 2017 - translated by S. Schler.

In 2020, her novel A Million Aunties was published in the Caribbean and North America, and it went on to be longlisted for the 2022 International Dublin Literary Award. Hardback and paperback editions were published in the United Kingdom in 2022 and 2023 respectively. In 2025, Stories from Yard was reissued with a new cover to celebrate its 20th anniversary on 9 September 2025.

McKenzie's stories have appeared in the following anthologies, among others: The Oxford Book of Caribbean Short Stories, Global Tales, Light Transports, Girls' Night In, Stories from Blue Latitudes, The Penguin Book of Caribbean Short Stories, Bridges: A Global Anthology of Short Stories, Crises, Risks and New Regionalisms in Europe, Extranezas cosmopolitas (Spanish), and Rómanska Ameríka (Icelandic). Literary magazines and sites that have carried her short fiction include The Malahat Review and Culture (French).

Her poetry has also been published in the Journal of Postcolonial Writing, the Journal of Caribbean Literatures, Leggere Donna, The Gleaner and other publications.

As a reporter, she has written numerous articles that have appeared in a range of media, including The Guardian, Black Enterprise, The Wall Street Journal Europe, New African, and Chess Life.

== Books ==
- Satellite City, Longman, 1992, ISBN 978-0-582-08688-3
- When the Rain Stopped in Natland, Illustrator Guy Parker-Rees, Longman, 1995, ISBN 978-0-582-12245-1
- Doctor’s Orders, Heinemann, 2005, ISBN 978-0-435-98827-2
- Stories from Yard, Peepal Tree Press, 2005 (reissued 2025), ISBN 978-1-900715-62-1
- Sweetheart, Peepal Tree Press, 2011, ISBN 978-1-84523-177-4
- A Million Aunties, Blouse & Skirt Books & Akashic Books, 2020, and Dialogue Publishing, 2022, 2023, ISBN 978-0-349-70253-7
- Gone to The Dogs (Madame), KRK Ediciones, Oviedo, 2023, ISBN 978-84-8367-787-2

== Selected translations ==
- De Perros (Madame), KRK Ediciones, Oviedo, 2023, translated by Emilia Maria Duran Almarza ISBN 978-84-8367-787-2
- Schätzchen (Sweetheart), edition pen im Loecker Verlag, Wien, 2020, ISBN 978-3-99098-053-8

== Awards and recognition ==
- 2022 - International Dublin Literary Award Longlist for A Million Aunties
- 2019 – Sunday Times Short Story Award longlist.
- 2017 – Prix Carbet des lycéens Winner for Trésor, the French translation of Sweetheart
- 2015 – Commonwealth Short Story Prize Shortlist for Cindy's Class
- 2012 – Commonwealth Book Prize Winner, Caribbean region, for Sweetheart
- 1993 – Commonwealth Writers' Prize Winner, Best First Book, Canada & the Caribbean, for Satellite City
