= Square Club =

Square Club may be

- Square Club (writers), a dining club in Edwardian London
- Harlem Square Club in the Overtown neighborhood of Miami, FL known for soul music
