= Girls' Night In =

Short-story compilation series

First edition (publ. HarperCollins)

Girls' Night In is a global short-story compilation series written mainly by female novelists, with all proceeds from the sale of the books going to charities War Child and, for one volume, another children's charity, No Strings. The first book was the brainchild of novelists Jessica Adams, Chris Manby, Freya North and Fiona Walker. Publishers include HarperCollins UK, Penguin Australia and Red Dress Ink USA. Team editors over the series include Jessica Adams, Maggie Alderson, Nick Earls, Imogen Edwards-Jones, Lauren Henderson, Chris Manby, Carole Matthews, Sarah Mlynowski and Fiona Walker. The series has been translated into Dutch and French and inspired a children's companion series, Kids' Night In. The literary agency representing the series in the UK and Australia is Curtis Brown, managed by Jonathan Lloyd and Tara Wynne respectively.

The first book in the series, Girls' Night In, was launched in London in June 2000 and subsequently in Australia in October 2000, with writers including Maggie Alderson, Wendy Holden, Lisa Jewell, Marian Keyes, Kathy Lette, Alecia McKenzie and Freya North. Later that year, sufficient funds had been raised to help War Child build the first Girls' Night In safe play area in the Dardania neighbourhood of Pristina, the capital of Kosovo.

Girls' Night In, Girls' Night In 2: Gentlemen by Invitation and Big Night Out collectively raised over AUS/USD$3 million for War Child, with over 940,000 books being sold worldwide. A digital version of Girls' Night In was published by HarperCollins UK in June 2015, following the digital publication of Girls' Night In 10th Anniversary Collection by Penguin Australia in 2014. Reviews for the Australian edition include, 'A special collection of short stories by some of the starriest names in the worlds of literature and fashion, including Nick Hornby, Candace Bushnell and Kate Moss . . . Read all about it' – Vogue, and - 'An enchanting and insightful collection featuring anyone who's anyone' – Elle All royalties from both digital editions go to War Child UK's work in Syria, Africa, Afghanistan and Iraq, donated by the editors and contributors.

Girls' Night In features stories from Jenny Colgan, Fiona Walker, Marian Keyes, Lisa Jewell, Stella Duffy, Isabel Wolff, Cathy Kelly, Jane Owen, Wendy Holden, Jessica Adams, Patricia Scanlan, Clare Naylor, Polly Samson, Alecia McKenzie, Adele Parks, Helen Lederer, Claire Calman, Yasmin Boland, Pauline McLynn, Victoria Routledge, Anna Maxted, Sheila O’Flanagan, Rosalyn Chisick, Tiffanie Darke, Karen Moline, Chrissie Manby, Daisy Waugh and Helen Simpson.

== Series ==
- Girls' Night In
- Girls' Night In 2: Gentlemen by Invitation
- Big Night Out
- Girls' Night In 4
- Girls' Night In - The Collection
- Kids' Night In
- Kids' Night In 2: A Feast of Stories
- Kids' Night In 3: A Sea of Stories and Oceans of Other Stuff
