= The Cloning of Joanna May =

1989 novel by Fay Weldon

- First edition cover
- Author: Fay Weldon
- Publisher: Collins
- Publication date: 1989
- ISBN: 978-0-002-23349-1

The Cloning of Joanna May is a 1989 science fiction novel by British writer Fay Weldon.

== Plot introduction ==
Joanna May was once married to Carl May, the wealthy CEO of a nuclear energy corporation, but they have been divorced for ten years after Joanna was caught in an incidental love affair. Carl arranged an "accident" for the lover and summarily locked Joanna out of all their homes, consigning her to an apartment. Since then, Carl May has done everything in his power to make Joanna's life difficult. When Joanna decides she's had enough, and pays a visit to her former husband, she is in for a surprise – Carl May has made several clones of her. Carl plans to take one or more of the clones as Joanna's replacement. The clones have been raised by foster parents without knowing each other. Each has become an archetype: an active career woman, a model with an icy disdain for men, a childless married woman contemplating an affair, and a mother trying to protect her children from their violent father. Carl's plans backfire when they meet each other and their "mother".

Sub-plots in the book involve Carl's current mistress, a "kept woman" passed from one rich patron to another, and Carl's past life. He was brought to the UK as a boy from Eastern Europe and abused by foster parents to the point where he was kept in a cage next to a dog. He was freed only when the foster parents were arrested for cruelty to animals. Nobody cared about him as a boy and as a result, he cares nothing for others.

== Television adaptation ==
The book was adapted into a two-part television serial for ITV in 1992, directed by Philip Saville. The first part was broadcast on ITV at 9 pm on Sunday 26 January 1992, with the second being shown the following Sunday. It starred Patricia Hodge and Brian Cox as Joanna and Carl May, with Peter Capaldi as Joanna's doomed lover. It was nominated for a Royal Television Society award for Best Production Design in 1992.

=== Differences between book and television ===
One of the main differences between the book and television version was the number of clones of Joanna May. The book has four clones, while the television series has three, the career woman (programming computers instead of working in media), the model, and the abused mother. The clones were played by three different actresses who only superficially resembled each other, the main common feature being red hair. Some of these, as explained by a scientist, were due to using different host cells for the DNA.

Carl's demise in the television version is also different. In the book he dies of radiation poisoning after swimming in a cooling pond at a reactor to demonstrate how safe it is, unaware that hostile parties have tampered with the radiation counters to make the water appear safe when it is deadly. In the television version he drowns, but seems to do so as the clones mysteriously appear in the water around him, dragging him down.
