= Puffball (film) =

2007 supernatural drama film

- UK theatrical release poster
- Directed by: Nicolas Roeg
- Screenplay by: Dan Weldon
- Based on: Puffball by Fay Weldon
- Produced by: Julie Baines; Dan Weldon; Ben Woolford; Paul Donovan; Michael Garland; Peter Measroch; Martin Paul-Hus
- Starring: Kelly Reilly; Miranda Richardson; Rita Tushingham; Donald Sutherland; Will Houston
- Cinematography: Nigel Willoughby
- Edited by: Tony Palmer
- Music by: Chris Crilly; Thierry Gauthier; Delphine Measroch
- Distributed by: Yume Pictures (2008) (UK)
- Release dates: 3 June 2007 (TIFF); 28 October 2007 (Canada); 29 February 2008 (U.S.)
- Running time: 120 minutes
- Countries: United Kingdom; Ireland; Canada
- Language: English
- Budget: £7 million

Puffball is a 2007 supernatural horror-thriller film directed by Nicolas Roeg, his final feature before his death in 2018. The script was adapted from Fay Weldon's 1980 novel of the same name by her son, Dan Weldon. The film was partially funded through the UK Film Council's New Cinema Fund. The film had its premiere at the Transilvania International Film Festival on 3 June 2007. The film was later released in Canada on 28 October 2007, and saw a limited release in the United States on 29 February 2008.

== Plot ==
Liffey, an ambitious young architect, moves to an isolated and eerie Irish valley to build a modern piece of architecture. The ruined cottage and land that she will use are a gift from her fiancé Richard, and is the former home of Molly, the elderly matriarch of a farming family living on the other side of the woods. Molly's daughter is Mabs, herself mother of three girls and wife to farmer Tucker. Now in her forties, Mabs wants another baby, a boy to inherit the farm – or perhaps she just wants to be pregnant again.

Mabs and Molly use black magic to give Mabs a baby boy. But Liffey becomes pregnant after sleeping with both Richard and Tucker, causing everybody to believe that her baby is Tucker's. Mabs seeks Molly's help again to kill Liffey's baby with magic, making it look like a miscarriage. Mabs's elder daughter helps Liffey successfully fight the spell. In the end, Mabs is finally pregnant with her own child, a boy.

== Cast ==
- Kelly Reilly – Liffey
- Miranda Richardson – Mabs Tucker
- Rita Tushingham – Molly
- Donald Sutherland – Lars
- William Houston – Tucker
- Oscar Pearce – Richard

== Production ==
Although the novel upon which it was based was set in rural England, the film was filmed and set in Monaghan, Ireland. In a 2008 interview, Roeg says of the location, "We shot in Ireland and without wishing to lean towards pretension or cliché there is a mysticism associated with the place... The atmosphere and the locations were very important and yes, as with my other films, it does become something of a character in its own right."

== Reception ==
The Guardian reviewer Philip French wrote of the film, "A curious mixture of Cold Comfort Farm, Straw Dogs and Rosemary's Baby, Puffball is certainly watchable." Blogcritics's Tony Dayoub was somewhat critical, writing "Puffball peters out at the end. There is a lot of build-up, but no payoff to the frightening imagery which the movie employs," but adding "There is enough to recommend a viewing of the film if you are a fan of Roeg's work."

Not Coming to a Theater Near You's Jason W was more negative, calling it, "a confused film which reminds us that Roeg’s best work will always remain his sexy masterpieces of the 1970s. Hints of Roeg’s brilliance are in short supply..." The Toronto Star's Geoff Pevere was also highly critical, writing that the film is "Hysterical when it's not merely ridiculous, and shot through with such signature Roegian distractions... Puffball might well be titled for the hypothetical drug one might need to take in order to take it seriously."
