= Fay Weldon =

British writer (1931–2023)

Fay Weldon CBE, FRSL
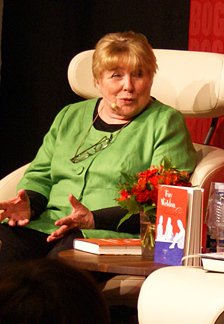
- Weldon at the Copenhagen Book Fair in 2008
- Born: Franklin Birkinshaw; 22 September 1931; Birmingham, England
- Died: 4 January 2023 (aged 91); Northampton, England
- Occupations: Author; essayist; playwright
- Spouses: Ronald Bateman (m. 1957; div. 1959) Ron Weldon (m. 1963; died 1994) Nick Fox (m. 1994; sep. 2020)
- Children: 4
- Parent: Margaret Jepson (mother)
- Relatives: Selwyn Jepson (uncle); Edgar Jepson (grandfather); Alan Birkinshaw (half-brother)
- Writing career
- Period: 1963–2018
- Notable works: Puffball (1980); The Life and Loves of a She-Devil (1983); The Cloning of Joanna May (1989); Wicked Women (1995); The Bulgari Connection (2000)

Fay Weldon (born Franklin Birkinshaw; 22 September 1931 – 4 January 2023) was a British author, essayist and playwright.

Over the course of her 55-year writing career, she published 31 novels, including Puffball (1980), The Cloning of Joanna May (1989), Wicked Women (1995) and The Bulgari Connection (2000), but was most well-known as the writer of The Life and Loves of a She-Devil (1983) which was televised by the BBC in 1986.

Married three times and with four children, Weldon was a feminist. Her work features what she described as "overweight, plain women". She said there were many reasons why she became a feminist, including the "appalling" lack of equal opportunities and the myth that women were supported by male relatives.

== Early life ==
Weldon was born Franklin Birkinshaw to a literary family in Birmingham, England, on 22 September 1931. Her maternal grandfather, Edgar Jepson (1863–1938), her uncle Selwyn Jepson and her mother Margaret Jepson wrote novels (the latter sometimes under the nom de plume Pearl Bellairs, from the name of a character in Aldous Huxley's short story "Farcical History of Richard Greenow").

Weldon grew up in Christchurch, New Zealand, where her father, Frank Thornton Birkinshaw, worked as a doctor. In 1936, when she was five, her parents agreed to separate, later divorcing (1940). She and her sister Jane spent the summers with her father, first in Coromandel, later in Auckland. She attended Christchurch Girls' High School for two years from 1944. Weldon described herself as a "plump, cheerful child", stating in a blog post that began as an unpublished article for the Daily Mail: "I was born large, blonde and big-boned into a family of small beautiful women. My mother thought it was unlikely that anyone would marry me, and therefore I would have to pass exams, earn my own living and make my own way in the world. Or that’s what I thought she thought." She goes on to explain how this view of herself affected her later writing career. "I’d be happier to have been seen as a skinny, feisty child, a slim and serious adult, and a handsome octogenarian with an interesting literary past. But that was not to be, despite a lifetime of diets. It was however a state of affairs which made me write a good few novels with overweight, plain women as their heroines. I’ve always been on their side – they are the unseen majority."

In September 1946, when she was 15, Weldon returned to England with her mother and sister. She recalled: "I was a literary groupie from the antipodes...Not that I had any intention of being a writer at the time – too much like hard work. All I wanted was to get married and have babies." She did not see her father again before his death in 1949.

In England Weldon won a scholarship to the all-girls South Hampstead High School, before going on to study Psychology and Economics at the University of St Andrews, Scotland. Later she recalled attending classes with the moral philosopher Malcolm Knox, who "spoke exclusively to the male students, maintaining that women were incapable of moral judgement or objectivity." She completed her Master of Arts in 1952 and moved to London, where she worked as a clerk at the Foreign Office for a salary of £6 a week.

== Early career ==
Weldon had temporary jobs as a waitress and hospital ward orderly before working as a clerk for the Foreign Office’s secret Information Research Department, where she wrote pamphlets to be dropped in Eastern Europe as part of the Cold War. She had to leave this job after she became pregnant. Later she took a job with Crawford's Advertising Agency, where she worked with the writer Elizabeth Smart, and where she could earn enough to support herself and her young son (Nicolas).

As head of copywriting at Ogilvy, Benson & Mather, she was responsible for publicising (but not originating) the phrase "Go to work on an egg". She coined the slogan "Vodka gets you drunker quicker", saying in a Guardian interview: "It just seemed ... to be obvious that people who wanted to get drunk fast needed to know this." Her bosses disagreed and suppressed it.

== Literary career ==
=== Writing career ===
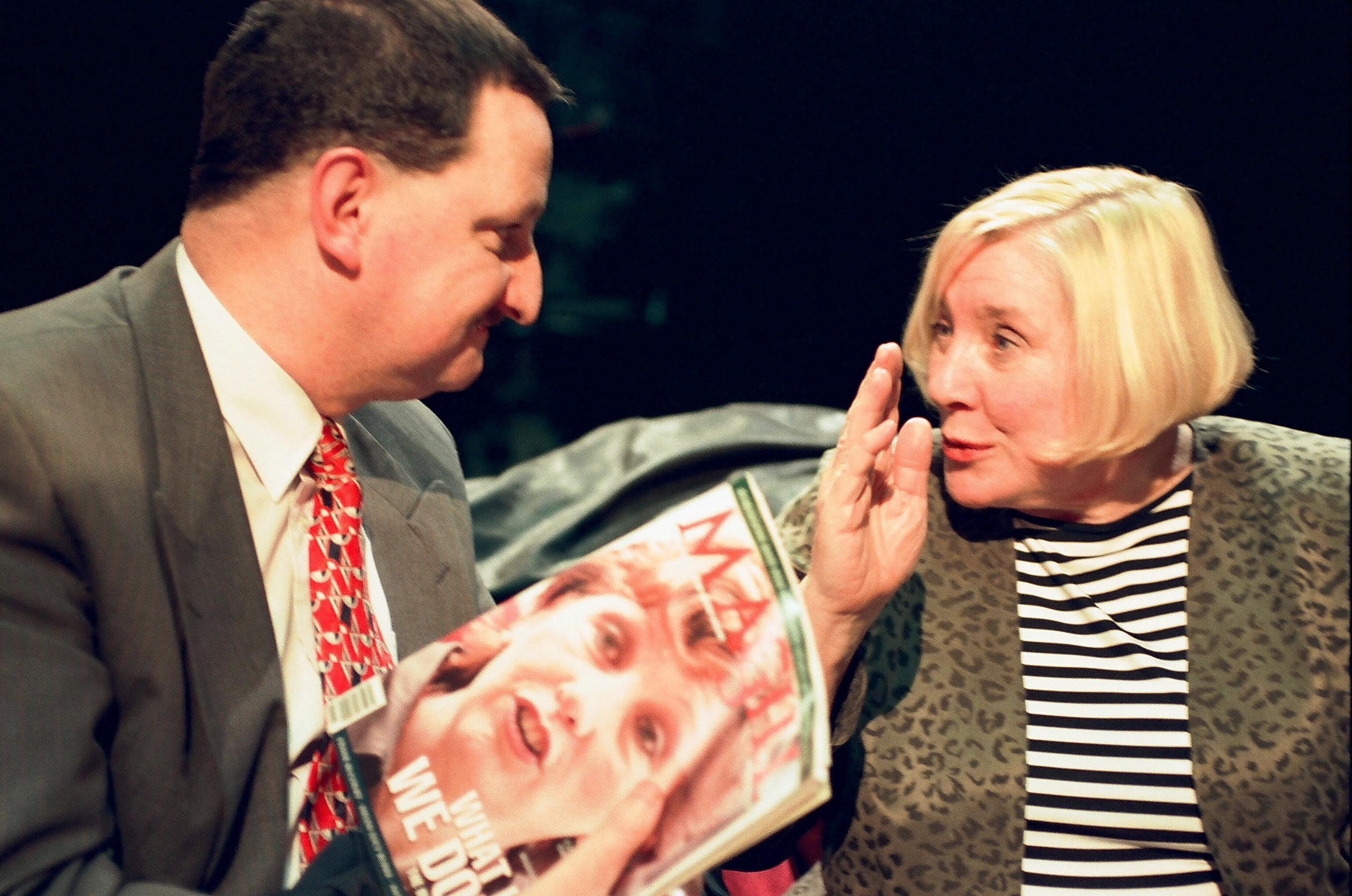
Appearing with Gerard Casey on British television discussion programme After Dark in 1997

In 1963 Weldon began writing for radio and television. Four years later her first novel, The Fat Woman's Joke, was published. "When I submitted my first novel in 1966 it was accepted without demur. I thought this was because I was a wonderful writer, But it wasn't. It was because I had learned to have nothing turned down." She subsequently built a successful and prolific career, publishing over thirty novels, collections of short stories, films for television, newspaper and magazine articles and becoming a well-known face and voice on the BBC. She described herself as a "writeaholic".

In 1971 Weldon wrote the first episode of the landmark television series Upstairs, Downstairs, for which she won a Writers Guild award for Best British TV Series Script. In 1980 Weldon wrote the screenplay for director/producer John Goldschmidt's television movie Life for Christine, which told the true story of a 14-year-old girl's life imprisonment. The film was shown in prime-time on the ITV Network by Granada Television. She also wrote the screenplay for the 1980 BBC miniseries adaptation of Jane Austen's Pride and Prejudice, starring Elizabeth Garvie and David Rintoul. In 1989, she contributed to the book for the Petula Clark West End musical Someone Like You.

Weldon's most celebrated work is her 1983 novel The Life and Loves of a She-Devil, which she wrote at the age of 52.

Her novel The Hearts and Lives of Men was written and published in serial form, appearing in the British magazine Woman between 1 February and 15 November 1986. She told The New York Times: "It was written as the Dickens novels were written....You made it up as you went along, confined by the structure of the story, which is going to go on for you don't know how long—but you have to be able to bring it to an end with three weeks' warning."

In 1993, her play Mr Director was produced at the Orange Tree Theatre in London. Its subject was the treatment of juveniles in a children's home.

In 2000, Weldon's novel The Bulgari Connection became notorious for its product placement, naming the jewellers not only in the title but another 34 times, while a minimum of 12 times was stipulated in the contract.

=== Other literary activities ===
In 1996, she was a member of the jury at the 46th Berlin International Film Festival. She was also chair of judges for the 1983 Booker Prize. The judging for that prize produced a draw between J. M. Coetzee's Life & Times of Michael K and Salman Rushdie's Shame, leaving Weldon to choose between the two. According to Stephen Moss in The Guardian, "Her arm was bent and she chose Rushdie" only to change her mind as the result was being phoned through.

Weldon was appointed Professor of Creative Writing at Brunel University in West London in 2006: "A great writer needs a certain personality and a natural talent for language, but there is a great deal that can be taught – how to put words together quickly and efficiently to make a point, how to be graceful and eloquent, how to convey emotion, how to build up tension, and how to create alternative worlds." In 2012 Weldon was appointed Professor of Creative Writing at Bath Spa University, where she shared an office with Professor Maggie Gee.

Weldon served together with Daniel Pipes as the most notable foreign members of the board of the Danish Free Press Society.

=== Feminism ===
A self-declared feminist, Weldon's work features what she described as "overweight, plain women" – as she deliberately sought, she said, to write about and give a voice to women who are often overlooked or not featured in the mainstream media. She said there were many reasons why she became a feminist, including "appalling" lack of equal opportunities and the myth that women were supported by male relatives. "What drove me to feminism fifty years ago was the myth that men were the breadwinners and women kept house and looked pretty." She noted that the turning point for her, however, was the outright sexism in the media industry at that time, such as when she attended a casting session of a TV drama she had written and watched the male director and producer "...cast the lead by flicking through Spotlight and just choosing the girl they both most fancied. And they were amazed when I objected: female skill, talent, experience, intelligence meant nothing to them".

However, some of Weldon's commentary drew controversy. In a 1998 interview for the Radio Times, Weldon stated that rape "isn't the worst thing that can happen to a woman if you're safe, alive and unmarked after the event." She was roundly condemned by groups representing women victims of rape and violence. In a 2017 interview on BBC Two's Newsnight, she expressed ambivalence about the successes of feminism. Social change had been enormous, "thanks to feminism", but it wasn't all wonderful: "We saw a world of young, healthy, intelligent, striving women. And we didn't really, honestly, take much notice of those who were not like us."

== Personal life and death ==
In 1953, while working at the Foreign Office, Weldon became pregnant by musician Colyn Davies whom she met when he was moonlighting as a doorman. She said that while she wanted the child (son Nicolas), she decided she did not want the father. In 1957, tired of struggling to support herself as a single mother, she married Ronald Bateman, a headmaster 25 years her senior. They lived together in Acton, London, for two years, until the marriage ended.

In 1961, aged 29, Weldon met her second husband, Ron Weldon, a jazz musician and antiques dealer. They married in 1963 when Fay was pregnant with her second son Dan (born that same year). They lived in East Compton, Somerset, later having two more sons, Tom (1970) and Sam (1977). It was while she was pregnant with Dan that Weldon began writing for radio and television. The couple visited therapists regularly and in 1992 Ron left Fay for his astrological therapist, who had told him that the couple's astrological signs were incompatible. They began divorce proceedings, although Ron died in 1994, just eight hours before the divorce was finalised.

In 1994 Weldon married Nick Fox, a poet who was also her manager, but instigated divorce proceedings in 2020.

In 2000 Weldon became a member of the Church of England and was confirmed in St Paul's Cathedral. She stated that she liked to think that she was "converted by St Paul".

Weldon died at a care home in Northampton, England, on 4 January 2023, at the age of 91. She was survived by her sons as well as twelve grandchildren and five great-grandchildren.

== Awards ==
- Writers' Guild Award for "On Trial", the pilot of the original TV programme Upstairs Downstairs (1973)
- The Booker Prize Best Novel nominee (1979) for Praxis
- Society of Authors Travelling Scholarship (1980)
- Winner of the Los Angeles Times Fiction Prize for The Heart of the Country (1989)
- Whitbread Prize Best Novel nominee (1996) for Worst Fears
- PEN/Macmillan Silver Pen Award (1996) for Wicked Women
- Commander of the Most Excellent Order of the British Empire (CBE) 2001

== Literary works ==
=== Novels ===
- The Fat Woman's Joke (also published as ... and the wife ran away) (1967)
- Down Among the Women (1971)
- Words of Advice (1974)
- Little Sisters (1975)
- Female Friends (1975)
- Remember Me (1976)
- Praxis (1978)
- Puffball (1980)
- The President's Child (1982)
- The Life and Loves of a She-Devil (1983)
- The Shrapnel Academy (1986)
- The Heart of the Country (1987)
- The Hearts and Lives of Men (1987)
- Leader of the Band (1988)
- The Cloning of Joanna May (1989)
- Darcy's Utopia (1990)
- Growing Rich (1992)
- Life Force (1992)
- Question of Timing (1992)
- Trouble (1993)
- Affliction (1994)
- Splitting (1995)
- Worst Fears (1996)
- Big Women (1997)
- Rhode Island Blues (2000)
- The Bulgari Connection (2000)
- Mantrapped (2004)
- She May Not Leave (2006)
- The Spa Decameron (2007)
- The Stepmother's Diary (2008)
- Chalcot Crescent (2009)
- Kehua! (2010)
- Death of a She Devil (2017)

=== Series ===
Love and Inheritance

- Habits of the House (2012)
- Long Live the King (2013)
- The New Countess (2013)
- Love and Inheritance Trilogy (2013) – Omnibus

Spoils of War

- Before the War (2017)
- After the Peace (2018)

The Chapbooks

- The Rules of Life (1987)
- Wolf the Mechanical Dog (1988)
- The Roots of Violence (1989)
- Party Puddle (1989)

=== Non-fiction ===
- Letters to Alice: On First Reading Jane Austen (1984)
- Rebecca West (1985)
- Sacred Cows: A Portrait of Britain, Post-Rushdie, Pre-Utopia (1989)
- Godless in Eden (1999)
- Auto da Fay (2002) – an autobiography of her early years.
- What Makes Women Happy (2006)
- Why Will No-One Publish My Novel? (2018)

=== Plays ===
- Madame Bovary: Breakfast with Emma (2003)
- Flood Warning (2003)
- The Four Alice Bakers (1999)
- The Reading Group (1999)
- Tess of The D’urbervilles (1992)
- Knightley’s State (1990)
- Someone Like You (1989)
- Nana (1988)
- Hole in the Top Of The World (1987)
- A Dolls House (1988)
- Jane Eyre, an adaptation of the novel by Charlotte Brontë, first performed 1986 (The Playhouse Theatre, London)
- After The Prize (1981)
- I Love My Love (1981)
- Action Replay - A Play (1980), first performed 1979 (Birmingham Repertory Studio Theatre);
- All The Bells Of Paradise (BBC, 1979)
- Mr. Director (1977)
- Moving House (1976)
- Friends (1975)
- Words of Advice (1970)
- Permanence (1969)
- Mixed Doubles (1969)
- The Last Word? (1967)

=== Anthologies containing stories by Fay Weldon ===
- The 4th Bumper Book of Ghost Stories (1980)
- The Literary Ghost (1991)
- The Penguin Book of Modern Fantasy by Women (1995)
- The Oxford Book of Twentieth-Century Ghost Stories (1996)
- Mistresses of the Dark (1998)
- The Mammoth Book of Twentieth-Century Ghost Stories (1998)
- Crossing the Border (1998)
- The Mammoth Book of Haunted House Stories (2000)

=== Collections and omnibus ===
- Watching Me, Watching You (1981)
- Polaris (1985)
- Moon Over Minneapolis (1991)
- Der Mann ohne Augen (1994) - Man With no Eyes, translated by Sabine Hedinger
- Angel, All Innocence (1995)
- Wicked Women (1995)
- A Hard Time to Be a Father (1998)
- Nothing to Wear and Nowhere to Hide (2002)
- Poolside (2007) - with Alice Adams, Amy Bloom, John Cheever, Ernest Hemingway, A. M. Homes, Andrea Lee, Joyce Carol Oates, Edna O'Brien, Julie Orringer, James Purdy, Graham Swift, John Updike and David Foster Wallace
- Great Escapes (2008) - with Amanda Craig, Virginia Ironside, Kathy Lette, Deborah Moggach, Kate Mosse, Lesley Pearse, Rose Tremain, Jane Elizabeth Varley and Isabel Wolff
- Man With no Eyes (2009) - Audiobook, Collection previously released in German in 1994
- Fay Weldon Omnibus: Collected Works of Fay Weldon (2014)
- Mischief (2015)
- The Collected Novels Volume One (2018)
- The Collected Novels Volume Two (2018)
- The Collected Novels Volume Three (2018)

=== Short stories and novellas ===
- "Angel, All Innocence" (1977) – short story
- "Weekend" (1978) – short story
- "Spirit of the House" (1980) – short story
- "Watching Me, Watching You" (1981) – short story
- "Down the Clinical Disco" (1985) – short story
- "A Good Sound Marriage" (US Journal, 1991) – short story
- The Ted Dreams (2014) – novella

== Television series (writer) ==
- Upstairs Downstairs (1971) (first episode, two others)
- Rooms (1974, 1976) (three episodes)
- Pride and Prejudice (1980)
- Heart of the Country (1987)
- Growing Rich (1992)
- Big Women (1998)

== Criticism and reviews ==
=== Chalcot Crescent ===
- Guinness, Molly (12 September 2009). "Family album". The Spectator. 311 (9446): 37–38. Archived from the original on 18 July 2011.
- "REVIEW : Fay Weldon – Chalcot Crescent". Upcoming4.me. 5 April 2012. Archived from the original on 30 June 2014.
