= Edgar Jepson =

English fiction writer

Alfred Jepson
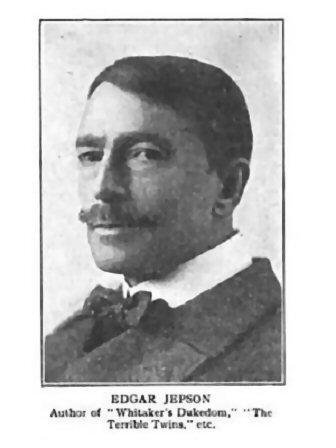
- National Magazine, 1915
- Born: Edgar Alfred Jepson; 28 November 1863; Bloomsbury, London, England
- Died: 12 April 1938 (aged 74); Hampstead, London, England
- Occupation: Author
- Spouse: Frita Bisham Holmes 1899–1933 (divorced)

Edgar Alfred Jepson (28 November 1863 – 12 April 1938) was an English author. He largely wrote mainstream adventure and detective fiction, but also supernatural and fantasy stories. He sometimes used the pseudonym R. Edison Page.

== Early life ==
Edgar Jepson was born on 28 November 1863 in Bloomsbury, London, but grew up in Kenilworth, Warwickshire, the second of five sons and three daughters raised by Alfred and Margaret Jepson (née Hutcheon). Jepson's father, a dentist, originally hailed from Gainsborough, Lincolnshire, while his mother was a Londoner (St Pancras). Jepson attended Leamington College for Boys (today North Leamington School) and graduated from Balliol College, Oxford. After his education, he spent some years in Barbados, before taking up residence in the King's Bench Walk area of London, where he began his literary career.

== Career ==
As an author, Jepson used a pseudonym, R. Edison Page, for some of his short stories. In other works he collaborated with such authors as John Gawsworth, Arthur Machen and Hugh Clevely. Jepson was also a translator, notably of the Arsène Lupin stories of Maurice Leblanc. He was a member of the Square Club (from 1908) of established Edwardian authors, and one of the more senior members of the New Bohemians drinking club. He was a good friend of the author Ford Madox Ford.

Jepson edited Vanity Fair magazine for a short period, during which he employed Richard Barham Middleton. Jepson did much to preserve Middleton's memory after his death.

Two of Jepson's children became writers. His son Selwyn Jepson was a crime writer, while his daughter, Margaret (married name Birkinshaw), published novels as Margaret Jepson, including Via Panama (1934). Margaret's younger daughter is the novelist Fay Weldon.

Edgar Jepson died on 12 April 1938 at his home in Hampstead. He was survived by his son and both daughters and by his former wife Frita Bisham Holmes, daughter of the violinist and composer Henry Holmes.

== Works ==
- Sir Jones (1885), as Jean F. Darrell Poges
- Sibyl Falcon (1895)
- The Passion for Romance (1896)
- The Keepers of the People (1898)
- On the Edge of Empire (1899), with David Beames
- The Dictator's Daughter (1902)
- The Horned Shepherd (1904)
- The Admirable Tinker: Child of the World (1904)
- Lady Noggs, Peeress (1905), children's stories
- The Triumph of Tinker (1906)
- The Four Philanthropists (1907)
- Tangled Wedlock (1908)
- Arsène Lupin (1909), based on play by Maurice Leblanc and Francis De Croisset
- The Mystery of the Myrtles (1909)
- The Girl's Head (1910)
- Lord Lisdor (1910)
- No. 19 (1910), also entitled The Garden at 19
- Pollyooly (1911), children's stories
- Captain Sentimental and Other Stories (1911)
- House on the Mall (1911)
- The Man with the Black Feather by Gaston Leroux (1912), translation
- The Terrible Twins (1913)
- The Second Pollyooly Book (1914), children's stories
- Alice Devine (1916)
- The Professional Prince (1917)
- Ann Annington (1918)
- The Loudwater Mystery (1920)
- Prince in Petrograd (1922)
- The Whiskered Footman (1922)
- Dorothy, the Rope Dancer by Maurice Leblanc (1923), translation
- Lady Noggs Assists (1924)
- Buried Rubies (1926)
- Peter Intervenes (1926)
- Emerald Tiger (1928)
- The Cuirass of Diamonds (1929)
- The Man with the Amber Eyes (1928), with Hugh Clevely
- The Murder in Romney Marsh (1929)
- The Moon Gods (1930)
- Gentle Binns (1931)
- Memories of a Victorian (1933), autobiography
- Memories of an Edwardian and Neo-Georgian (1937), autobiography
