= Strangers on a Train (film) =

1951 film by Alfred Hitchcock

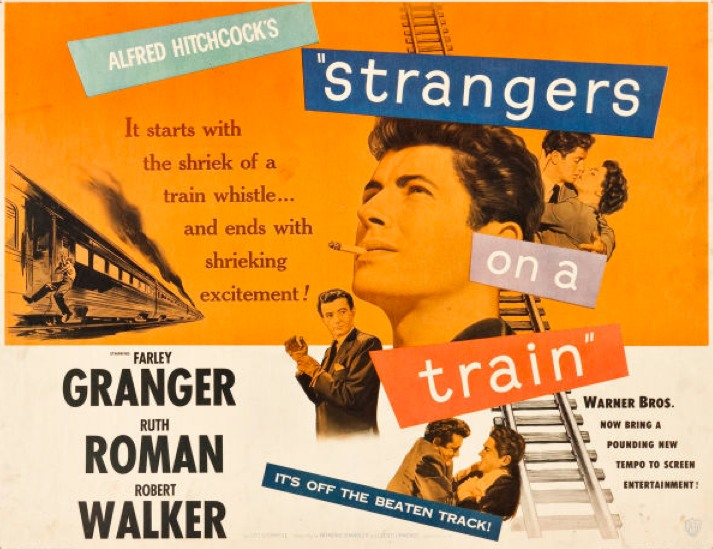
- Poster by Bill Gold
- Directed by: Alfred Hitchcock
- Screenplay by: Raymond Chandler; Czenzi Ormonde
- Adaptation by: Whitfield Cook
- Based on: Strangers on a Train; 1950 novel by Patricia Highsmith
- Produced by: Alfred Hitchcock
- Starring: Farley Granger; Ruth Roman; Robert Walker
- Cinematography: Robert Burks
- Edited by: William Ziegler
- Music by: Dimitri Tiomkin
- Production company: Transatlantic Pictures
- Distributed by: Warner Bros.
- Release date: June 30, 1951
- Running time: 101 minutes
- Country: United States
- Language: English
- Budget: $1.2 million
- Box office: $7 million

Strangers on a Train is a 1951 American psychological thriller film noir produced and directed by Alfred Hitchcock, and adapted by Raymond Chandler and Czenzi Ormonde from the 1950 novel by Patricia Highsmith. It was shot in late 1950, and released by Warner Bros. Pictures on June 30, 1951, starring Farley Granger, Ruth Roman and Robert Walker.

The story concerns two strangers who meet on a train, one of whom is a psychopath who suggests that they "exchange" murders so that neither will be caught. The film initially received mixed reviews, but has since been regarded much more favorably. In 2021, the film was selected for preservation in the United States National Film Registry by the Library of Congress as being "culturally, historically, or aesthetically significant".

== Plot ==
The original trailer for Strangers on a Train

Amateur tennis star Guy Haines wants to divorce his promiscuous wife, Miriam, so he can marry Anne Morton, the daughter of a US Senator. On a train, wealthy smooth-talking psychopath Bruno Antony recognizes Haines and reveals his idea for a murder scheme: two strangers meet and "swap murders", with Bruno suggesting he kill Miriam and Guy kill Bruno's hated father. Each will murder a stranger, with no apparent motive, so neither will be suspected. Guy humors Bruno by pretending to find his idea amusing but is so eager to get away from Bruno that he leaves behind his engraved cigarette lighter.

Guy meets Miriam, who is pregnant by someone else, at her workplace in Metcalf, their hometown. Guy gives her the money she demanded to pay for a divorce lawyer, but Miriam tells him she is no longer interested in a divorce, and threatens to claim that he is the father if he pursues a divorce. That evening Bruno follows Miriam to an amusement park and strangles her while Guy is on the train to Washington, D.C. When Guy arrives home Bruno informs him Miriam is dead and insists that he must now honor their deal.

Guy goes to the Mortons' home, where Anne's father informs Guy that his wife has been murdered. Anne's sister, Barbara, says that the police will think that Guy is the murderer since he has a motive. The police question Guy but cannot confirm his alibi: a professor Guy met on the train was so drunk that he cannot remember their encounter. The police assign an escort to watch him.

Bruno follows Guy around Washington, introduces himself to Anne, and appears at a party at Senator Morton's house. To amuse another guest, Bruno playfully demonstrates how to strangle a woman. His gaze falls upon Barbara, whose appearance resembles Miriam's. This triggers a flashback: Bruno compulsively squeezes the woman's neck, and other guests intervene to stop him from strangling her to death. Barbara tells Anne that Bruno was looking at her while strangling the other woman, and Anne realizes Barbara's resemblance to Miriam. Her suspicions aroused, Anne confronts Guy, who tells her the truth about Bruno's scheme.

Bruno sends Guy a package containing a pistol, a house key, and a map showing the location of his father's bedroom. Guy creeps into Bruno's father's room to warn him of his son's murderous intentions but instead finds Bruno there waiting for him. Guy tries to persuade Bruno to seek psychiatric help, but Bruno threatens to punish Guy for breaking their deal.

Anne visits Bruno's home and tries to explain to his befuddled and besotted mother that her son is a murderer. Bruno overhears and when his mother leaves mentions Guy's missing cigarette lighter to Anne and claims that Guy asked him to search the murder site for it. Guy infers that Bruno intends to plant it at the scene of the murder and incriminate him. After winning a tennis match Guy evades the police escort, helped by Barbara, and heads for the amusement park to stop Bruno.

When Bruno arrives at the amusement park, a carnival worker recognizes him from the night of the murder; he informs the police, who think he has recognized Guy. After Guy arrives, he and Bruno fight on the park's carousel. Believing that Guy is trying to escape, a police officer shoots at him but instead kills the carousel operator, causing the carousel to spin out of control. A carnival worker crawls underneath it and applies the brakes too abruptly, causing the carousel to spin off its support, trapping the mortally injured Bruno underneath. The worker who called the police tells them that Bruno, not Guy, is the one he remembers seeing the night of the murder. As Bruno dies, his fingers unclench to reveal Guy's lighter in his hand. Realizing that Guy is not the murderer, the police ask him to come to the station to tie up loose ends.

Some time later, another stranger on a train attempts to strike up conversation with Guy in the same way as Bruno did. Guy and Anne abruptly hurry away from him.

== Cast ==
In one of his trademark cameos, Hitchcock, carrying a double bass, boards the train in Metcalf after Farley Granger's character exits.

- Farley Granger as Guy Haines
- Ruth Roman as Anne Morton
- Robert Walker as Bruno Antony
- Leo G. Carroll as Senator Morton
- Patricia Hitchcock as Barbara Morton
- Kasey Rogers (credited as Laura Elliott) as Miriam Joyce Haines
- Marion Lorne as Mrs. Antony
- Jonathan Hale as Mr. Antony
- Howard St. John as Police Capt. Turley
- John Brown as Professor Collins
- Norma Varden as Mrs. Cunningham
- Robert Gist as Detective Hennessey
- John Doucette as Det. Hammond (uncredited)
- Jack Cushingham as Fred Reynolds (uncredited)

Alfred Hitchcock's cameo appearance occurs 11 minutes into the film. He is seen carrying a double bass as he climbs onto a train.

Hitchcock said that correct casting saved him "a reel of storytelling time", since audiences would sense qualities in the actors that did not have to be spelled out. Hitchcock said that he originally wanted William Holden for the Guy Haines role, but Holden declined. "Holden would have been all wrong—too sturdy, too put off by Bruno", wrote critic Roger Ebert. "Granger is softer and more elusive, more convincing as he tries to slip out of Bruno's conversational web instead of flatly rejecting him."

Warner Bros wanted their own stars, already under contract, cast wherever possible. In the casting of Anne Morton, Jack L. Warner got what he wanted when he assigned Ruth Roman to the project, over Hitchcock's objections. The director found her "bristling" and "lacking in sex appeal" and said that she had been "foisted upon him". Perhaps it was the circumstances of her forced casting, but Roman became the target of Hitchcock's scorn throughout the production. Granger described Hitchcock's attitude toward Roman as "disinterest" in the actress and said he saw Hitchcock treat Edith Evanson the same way on the set of Rope (1948). "He had to have one person in each film he could harass", Granger said.

Kasey Rogers noted that she had perfect vision at the time the film was made, but Hitchcock insisted she wear the character's thick eyeglasses, even in long shots when regular glass lenses would have been undetectable. Rogers was effectively blind with the glasses on and needed to be guided by the other actors.

== Production ==
=== Pre-production ===
Hitchcock secured the rights to the Patricia Highsmith novel for just $7,500 ($79,000 in 2025) since it was her first novel. As usual, Hitchcock kept his name out of the negotiations to keep the purchase price low. Highsmith was quite annoyed when she later discovered who had bought the rights for such a small amount.

Securing the rights to the novel was the least of the hurdles Hitchcock would have to vault to get the property from printed page to screen. He got a treatment that pleased him on the second attempt, from writer Whitfield Cook, who wove a homoerotic subtext into the story. With treatment in hand, Hitchcock shopped for a screenwriter; he wanted a "name" writer to lend some prestige to the screenplay but was turned down by eight writers, including John Steinbeck and Thornton Wilder, all of whom thought the story too tawdry and were put off by Highsmith's first-timer status. Talks with Dashiell Hammett got further, but here too communications ultimately broke down, and Hammett never took the assignment.

Hitchcock then tried Raymond Chandler, who had earned an Oscar nomination for his first screenplay, Double Indemnity, in collaboration with Billy Wilder. Chandler took the job despite his opinion that it was "a silly little story." But Chandler was a notoriously difficult collaborator and the two men could not have had more different meeting styles: Hitchcock enjoyed long, rambling off-topic meetings where often the film would not even be mentioned for hours, while Chandler was strictly business and wanted to get out and get writing. He called the meetings "god-awful jabber sessions which seem to be an inevitable although painful part of the picture business." Chandler also felt that the original novel's plot was superior to Hitchcock's version and argued that it should be restored. He complained privately that Hitchcock was too ready “to sacrifice dramatic logic (insofar as it exists) for the sake of a camera effect.” Interpersonal relations deteriorated rapidly until finally Chandler became openly combative: at one point, on noticing Hitchcock struggling to exit from his limousine, Chandler remarked within earshot, "Look at the fat bastard trying to get out of his car!" This would be their last collaboration. Chandler completed a first draft, then wrote a second, without hearing a single word back from Hitchcock; when finally he did get a communication from the director in late September, it was his dismissal from the project.

Next, Hitchcock tried to hire Ben Hecht, but learned he was unavailable. Hecht suggested his assistant, Czenzi Ormonde, to write the screenplay. Although Ormonde was without a formal screen credit, she did have two things in her favor: her recently published collection of short stories, Laughter From Downstairs, was attracting good notices from critics, and she was "a fair-haired beauty with long shimmering hair."—always a plus with Hitchcock. With his new writer, he wanted to start from square one:

At their first conference, Hitchcock made a show of pinching his nose, then holding up Chandler's draft with his thumb and forefinger and dropping it into a wastebasket. He told the obscure writer that the famous one hadn't written a solitary line he intended to use, and they would have to start all over on page one, using Cook's treatment as a guide. The director told Ormonde to forget all about the book, then told her the story of the film himself, from beginning to end.

There was not much time though—less than three weeks until location shooting was scheduled to start in the East. Ormonde hunkered down with Hitchcock's associate producer Barbara Keon—disparagingly called "Hitchcock's factotum" by Chandler—and Alma Reville, Hitchcock's wife. Together the three women, working under the boss's guidance and late into most nights, finished enough of the script in time to send the company East. The rest was complete by early November. Three notable additions the trio had made were the runaway merry-go-round, the cigarette lighter, and the thick eyeglasses.

There was one point of agreement between Chandler and Hitchcock, although it would come only much later, near the release of the film: they both acknowledged that since virtually none of Chandler's work remained in the final script, his name should be removed from the credits. Hitchcock preferred the writing credit of Whitfield Cook and Czenzi Ormonde, but Warner Bros. wanted the cachet of the Chandler name and insisted it stay on.

Even while the tortuous writing stage was plodding its course, the director's excitement about the project was boundless. "Hitchcock raced ahead of everyone: the script, the cast, the studio... pieces of the film were dancing like electrical charges in his brain." The more the film resolved in his mind's eye, the more he knew his director of photography would play a critical role in the scenes' execution. He found exactly what he needed right on the Warners lot in the person of staff cameraman Robert Burks, who would continue to work with Hitchcock, shooting every Hitchcock picture through to Marnie (1964), with the exception of Psycho. "Low-keyed, mild mannered", Burks was "a versatile risk-taker with a penchant for moody atmosphere. Burks was an exceptionally apt choice for what would prove to be Hitchcock's most Germanic film in years: the compositions dense, the lighting almost surreal, the optical effects demanding." None was more demanding than Bruno's strangulation of Miriam, shown reflected in her eyeglass lens: "It was the kind of shot Hitchcock had been tinkering with for twenty years—and Robert Burks captured it magnificently."

Burks considered his fourteen years with Hitchcock the best of his career: "You never have any trouble with him as long as you know your job and do it. Hitchcock insists on perfection. He has no patience with mediocrity on the set or at a dinner table. There can be no compromise in his work, his food or his wines." Robert Burks received the film's sole Academy Award nomination for its black and white photography.

=== Production ===
With cast nailed down, a script in hand, and a director of photography in tune with Hitchcock's vision on board, the company was ready to commence filming. Hitchcock had a crew shoot background footage of the 1950 Davis Cup finals held August 25–27, 1950 at the West Side Tennis Club in Forest Hills, New York. While there, the crew had done some other location scouting. Exteriors would be shot on both coasts, and interiors on Warner Brothers' soundstages.

Hitchcock and his cast and crew decamped for the East Coast on October 17, 1950. For six days, they shot at Penn Station in New York City, at the railroad station at Danbury, Connecticut—which became Guy's hometown of Metcalf—and in spots around Washington, D.C.

By month's end, they were back in California. Hitchcock had written exacting specifications for an amusement park, which was constructed on the ranch of director Rowland Lee in Chatsworth, California. The amusement park exteriors were shot there and at an actual Tunnel of Love at a fairground in Canoga Park, California. Hitchcock had already shot the long shots for the tennis match at Forest Hills and would add closer shots with Granger and Jack Cushingham, Granger's tennis coach off-screen and Guy's tennis opponent Fred Reynolds on-screen at a tennis club in South Gate, California. The rest of the shooting would take place on Warner soundstages, including many seemingly exterior and on-location shots that were actually done inside in front of rear-projection screens.

Strangers on a Train marked something of a renaissance for Hitchcock, after several years of low enthusiasm for his late-1940s output, and he threw himself into the micromanagement of some of its production. Hitchcock himself designed Bruno's lobster necktie, revealed in a close-up to have strangling lobster claws, and "he personally selected an orange peel, a chewing-gum wrapper, wet leaves, and a bit of crumpled paper that were used for sewer debris" in the scene where Bruno inadvertently drops Guy's lighter down the storm drain.

He also showed intense interest in a seldom-considered detail of character delineation: food.

"Preferences in food characterize people..." Hitchcock said. "I have always given it careful consideration, so that my characters never eat out of character. Bruno orders with gusto and with an interest in what he is going to eat — lamb chops, French fries, and chocolate ice cream. A very good choice for train food. And the chocolate ice cream is probably what he thought about first. Bruno is rather a child. He is also something of a hedonist. Guy, on the other hand, shows little interest in eating the lunch, apparently having given it no advance thought, in contrast to Bruno, and he merely orders what seems his routine choice, a hamburger and coffee."

Hitchcock and Burks collaborated on a double printing technique to create this iconic shot still studied in film schools today.

One of the most memorable single shots in the Hitchcock canon—it "is studied by film classes", says Kasey Rogers, who played Miriam—is her character's strangulation by Bruno on the Magic Isle. "[I]n one of the most unexpected, most aesthetically justified moments in film," the slow, almost graceful, murder is shown as a reflection in the victim's eyeglasses, which have been jarred loose from her head and dropped to the ground. The unusual angle was a more complex proposition than it seems. First Hitchcock got the exterior shots in Canoga Park, using both actors, then later he had Rogers alone report to a soundstage where there was a large concave reflector set on the floor. The camera was on one side of the reflector, Rogers was on the other, and Hitchcock directed Rogers to turn her back to the reflector and "float backwards, all the way to the floor... like you were doing the limbo." The first six takes went badly—Rogers thudded to the floor with several feet yet to go—but on the seventh take, she floated smoothly all the way. Hitchcock's even-strained response: "Cut. Next shot." Hitchcock then had the two elements "ingenious[ly]" double printed, yielding a shot of "oddly appealing originality [with] a stark fusion of the grotesque and the beautiful.... The aestheticizing of the horror somehow enables the audience to contemplate more fully its reality."

Hitchcock was, above all, the master of great visual set piece, and "[p]erhaps the most memorable sequence in Strangers on a Train is the climactic fight on a berserk carousel." While Guy and Bruno fight, the ride runs out of control until it tears itself to pieces, flinging wooden horses into the crowd of screaming mothers and squealing children. "The climactic carousel explosion was a marvel of miniatures and background projection, acting close-ups and other inserts, all of it seamlessly matched and blended under film editor William H. Ziegler's eye."

Hitchcock took a toy carousel and photographed it blown up by a small charge of explosives. This piece of film he then enlarged and projected onto a vast screen, positioning actors around and in front of it so that the effect is one of a mob of bystanders into which plaster horses and passengers are hurled in deadly chaos. It is one of the moments in Hitchcock's work that continues to bring gasps from every audience and applause from cinema students.

The explosion is triggered by the attempts of a carnival man to stop the ride after crawling under the whirling carousel deck to get to the controls in the center. Although Hitchcock admitted to undercranking the shot (artificially accelerating the action), it was not a trick shot: the man actually had to crawl under the spinning ride, just inches from possible injury. "Hitchcock told me that this scene was the most personally frightening moment for him in any of his films", writes biographer Charlotte Chandler. "The man who crawled under the out-of-control carousel was not an actor or a stuntman, but a carousel operator who volunteered for the job. 'If the man had raised his head even slightly", Hitchcock said, "it would have gone from being a suspense film into a horror film."

The final scene of the so-called American version of the film has Barbara and Anne Morton waiting for Guy to call on the telephone. Hitchcock wanted the phone in the foreground to dominate the shot, emphasizing the importance of the call, but the limited depth-of-field of contemporary motion picture lenses made it difficult to get both phone and women in focus. So Hitchcock had an oversized phone constructed and placed in the foreground. Anne reaches for the big phone, but actually answers a regular one: "I did that on one take", Hitchcock explained, "by moving in on Anne so that the big phone went out of the frame as she reached for it. Then a grip put a normal-sized phone on the table, where she picked it up."

Principal photography wrapped just before Christmas, and Hitchcock and Alma left for a vacation in Santa Cruz, then in late March 1951, on to St Moritz, for a 25th-anniversary European excursion.

=== Music ===
Composer Dimitri Tiomkin was Jack Warner's choice to score Strangers on a Train. While he had previous Hitchcock experience on Shadow of a Doubt (1943), and would go on to score two more consecutive Hitchcock films, the director and composer "simply never developed much of a kinship" and "the Hitchcock films are not Tiomkin's best".

Nevertheless, the score does pick up on the ubiquitous theme of doubles—often contrasting doubles—right from the opening title sequence: "The first shot—two sets of male shoes, loud versus conservative, moving toward a train—carries a gruff bass motif set against Gershwin-like riffs, a two-part medley called "Strangers" and "Walking" that is never heard again." The powerful music accurately underscores the visuals of that title sequence—the massive granite edifice of New York's Pennsylvania Station, standing in for Washington's Union Station—because it was scored for an unusually large orchestra, including alto, tenor and baritone saxes, three clarinets, four horns, three pianos and a novachord.

Tiomkin's contrasting musical themes continued throughout the film, delineating two characters with substantial differences: "For 'Guy's Theme', Tiomkin created a hesitant, passive idea, made-to-order music for Farley Granger's performance." Bruno, who tells Guy on the train that he admires people "who do things", gets a more vigorous musical treatment from Tiomkin: "Harmonic complexity defines the motifs associated with Bruno: rumbling bass, shocking clusters, and glassy string harmonics. These disturbing sounds, heard to superb effect in cues such as 'The Meeting,' 'Senator's Office,' and 'Jefferson Memorial,' are not just about Bruno, but about how he is perceived by those whose lives he crosses—first Guy, then everyone in Guy's entourage."

But perhaps the most memorable music in Strangers is the calliope music, heard first at the fairground and again, later, when Bruno is strangling Mrs Cunningham at Senator Morton's soirée and experiences his unfortunate flashback and subsequent fainting spell. It was Hitchcock, not Tiomkin, whose idea brought the four evocative numbers—"The Band Played On", "Carolina in the Morning", "Oh, You Beautiful Doll", and "Baby Face"—to the soundtrack:

In one of Hitchcock's most explicit operatic gestures, the characters at the fateful carnival sing the score, giving it full dimension as part of the drama. In a conventional movie, the tune would play in the background as a clever ironic backdrop. But Hitchcock takes music to another level. Miriam and the two boyfriends in her odd ménage à trois bring "The Band Played On" to life by singing it on the merry-go-round, lustily and loudly... Grinning balefully on the horse behind them, Bruno then sings it himself, making it his motto. The band plays on through Bruno's stalking of his victim and during the murder itself, blaring from the front of the screen, then receding into the darkness as an eerie obbligato when the doomed Miriam enters the Tunnel of Love.

"The Band Played On" makes its final reprise during Guy's and Bruno's fight on the merry-go-round, even itself shifting to a faster tempo and higher pitch when the policeman's bullet hits the ride operator and sends the carousel into its frenzied hyper-drive.

Critic Jack Sullivan had kinder words for Tiomkin's score for Strangers than did biographer Spoto: "[S]o seamlessly and inevitably does it fit the picture's design that it seems like an element of Hitchcock's storyboards", he writes. It is a score that "goes largely uncelebrated."

=== Promotion and release ===
With a release scheduled for early summer, the studio press agents swung into high gear early in 1951. Hitchcock, promotionally photographed many times over the years strangling various actresses and other women—some one-handed, others two—found himself in front of a camera with his fingers around the neck of a bust of daughter Patricia; the photo found its way into newspapers nationwide. He was also photographed adding the letter L to Strangers on the official studio poster for the film, thus changing the word to Stranglers.

One studio press release gave rise to a myth that still lingers on today. Hitchcock and Patricia both were afraid of heights, and father offered daughter a hundred dollars to ride the Ferris wheel—only to order the power cut, leaving her in the dark at the very top of the ride. The press release embellished the tale, claiming he left her "dangling in total darkness for an hour," only then allowing his "trembling daughter" to be lowered and released. Although that account continues to be published in books to this day, "it just wasn't true", according to Patricia Hitchcock O'Connell. First of all, she was not up there alone: flanking her were the actors playing Miriam's two boyfriends—"and I have a picture of us waving." "This was good stuff for press agents paid to stir up thrills and it has been repeated in other books to bolster the idea of Hitchcock's sadism," but "we were [only] up there two or three minutes at the outside.... My father wasn't ever sadistic. The only sadistic part was I never got the hundred dollars."

Strangers on a Train previewed on March 5, 1951, at the Huntington Park Theatre, with Alma, Jack Warner, Whitfield Cook and Barbara Keon in the Hitchcock party and it won a prize from the Screen Directors Guild. It premiered in New York on July 3, marking the reopening of the extensively remodeled Strand Theatre as the Warner Theatre, and in a dozen cities around the country. Hitchcock made personal appearances in most of them, and was often accompanied by his daughter.

Some audience feedback arriving at Jack Warner's office condemned the film for its sordid story, while just as many others were favorable. Of greater interest to Warner was the box office take, and the "receipts soon told the true story: Strangers on a Train was a success, and Hitchcock was pronounced at the top of his form as master of the dark, melodramatic suspense thriller."

== Themes and motifs ==
The film includes a number of puns and visual metaphors that demonstrate a running motif of crisscross, double-crossing, and crossing one's double. Talking about the structure of the film, Hitchcock said to Truffaut, "Isn't it a fascinating design? One could study it forever."

The two characters, Guy and Bruno, can be viewed as doppelgängers. As with Shadow of a Doubt, Strangers on a Train is one of many Hitchcock films to explore the doppelgänger theme. The pair has what writer Peter Dellolio refers to as a "dark symbiosis." Bruno embodies Guy's dark desire to kill Miriam, a "real-life incarnation of Guy's wish-fulfillment fantasy".

=== Doubles ===
The theme of doubles is "the key element in the film's structure," and Hitchcock starts right off in his title sequence making this point: there are two taxicabs, two redcaps, two pairs of feet, two sets of train rails that cross twice. Once on the train, Bruno orders a pair of double drinks—"The only kind of doubles I play", he says charmingly. In Hitchcock's cameo he carries a double bass.

There are two respectable and influential fathers, two women with eyeglasses, and two women at a party who delight in thinking up ways of committing the perfect crime. There are two sets of two detectives in two cities, two little boys at the two trips to the fairground, two old men at the carousel, two boyfriends accompanying the woman about to be murdered, and two Hitchcocks in the film.

Hitchcock carries the theme into his editing, crosscutting between Guy and Bruno with words and gestures: one asks the time and the other, miles away, looks at his watch; one says in anger "I could strangle her!" and the other, far distant, makes a choking gesture.

This doubling has some precedent in the novel, but more of it was deliberately added by Hitchcock, "dictated in rapid and inspired profusion to Czenzi Ormonde and Barbara Keon during the last days of script preparation." It undergirds the whole film because it finally serves to associate the world of light, order, and vitality with the world of darkness, chaos, lunacy and death."

Guy and Bruno are in some ways doubles, but in many more ways, they are opposites. The two sets of feet in the title sequence match each other in motion and in cutting, but they immediately establish the contrast between the two men: the first shoes "showy, vulgar brown-and-white brogues; [the] second, plain, unadorned walking shoes." They also demonstrate Hitchcock's gift for deft visual storytelling: For most of the film, Bruno is the actor, Guy the reactor, and Hitchcock always shows Bruno's feet first, then Guy's. And since it is Guy's foot that taps Bruno's under the table, we know Bruno has not engineered the meeting.

Roger Ebert wrote that "it is this sense of two flawed characters—one evil, one weak, with an unstated sexual tension—that makes the movie intriguing and halfway plausible, and explains how Bruno could come so close to carrying out his plan."

=== Darkness–light continuum ===
It is those flaws that set up the real themes of Strangers. It was not enough for Hitchcock to construct merely a world of doubles—even contrasting doubles—in a strict polar-opposite structure; for Hitchcock, the good-and-evil, darkness-and-light poles "didn't have to be mutually exclusive." Blurring the lines puts both Guy and Bruno on a good-evil continuum, and the infinite shades of gray in between, became Hitchcock's canvas for telling the story and painting his characters.

At first glance, Guy represents the ordered life where people stick to rules, while Bruno comes from the world of chaos, where they get thrown out of multiple colleges for drinking and gambling. Yet both men, like so many of Hitchcock's protagonists, are insecure and uncertain of their identity. Guy is suspended between tennis and politics, between his tramp wife and his senator's daughter, and Bruno is seeking desperately to establish an identity through violent, outré actions and flamboyance (shoes, lobster-patterned tie, name proclaimed to the world on his tiepin)."

Bruno tells Guy early on that he admires him: "I certainly admire people who do things", he says. "Me, I never do anything important." Yet as Bruno describes his "theories" over lunch, "Guy responds to Bruno—we see it in his face, at once amused and tense. To the man committed to a career in politics, Bruno represents a tempting overthrow of all responsibility." And at this point the blurring of good and evil accelerates: Guy fails to repudiate Bruno's suggestive statement about murdering Miriam ("What's a life or two, Guy? Some people are better off dead.") with any force or conviction. "When Bruno openly suggests he would like to kill his wife, he merely grins and says 'That's a morbid thought,' but we sense the tension that underlies it." It ratchets up a notch when Guy leaves Bruno's compartment and "forgets" his cigarette lighter. "He is leaving in Bruno's keeping his link with Anne, his possibility of climbing into the ordered existence to which he aspires.... Guy, then, in a sense connives at the murder of his wife, and the enigmatic link between him and Bruno becomes clear."

=== Light and dark onscreen ===
Having given his characters overlapping qualities of good and evil, Hitchcock then rendered them on the screen according to a very strict template, with which he stuck to a remarkable degree. Ebert wrote:

Hitchcock was a classical technician in terms of controlling his visuals, and his use of screen space underlined the tension in ways the audience isn't always aware of. He always used the convention that the left side of the screen is for evil and/or weaker characters, while the right is for characters who are either good or temporarily dominant.

Nowhere is this more evident than the scene where Guy arrives home at his D.C. apartment to find Bruno lurking across the street; Bruno killed Miriam that evening in Metcalf, and has her glasses to give to Guy almost as a "receipt" that he has executed his part of their "deal". "On one side of the street, [are] stately respectable houses; towering in the background, on the right of the screen, the floodlit dome of the U.S. Capitol, the life to which Guy aspires, the world of light and order." Bruno tells Guy what he has done and gives him the glasses. "You're a free man now", he says, just as a police car drives up, looking for the husband of a certain recent murder victim. Guy nervously steps into the shadows with Bruno, literally behind the bars of an iron fence; "You've got me acting like I'm a criminal", he says. "The scene gives a beautifully exact symbolic expression to Guy's relationship with Bruno and what he stands for."

Hitchcock continues the interplay of light and dark throughout the film: Guy's bright, light tennis attire, versus "the gothic gloominess of [Bruno's] Arlington mansion"; the crosscutting between his game in the sunshine at Forest Hills while Bruno's arm stretches into the dark and debris of the storm drain trying to fish out the cigarette lighter; even a single image where "Walker is photographed in one visually stunning shot as a malignant stain on the purity of the white-marble Jefferson Memorial, as a blot on the order of things."

=== Political subtext ===
Although its first rumblings came in 1947 with the trial and conviction of the "Hollywood Ten," the so-called Red Scare was gathering steam in 1950, with the espionage-related arrests of Julius and Ethel Rosenberg and the trial of Alger Hiss. These events were the background to their work, while Hitchcock, Cook, Ormonde and Keon were preparing the script for Strangers, and film scholar Robert L. Carringer has written of a political subtext to the film. Treatment writer Cook used Guy to make the film "a parable quietly defiant of the Cold War hysteria sweeping America."

That hysteria was targeting homosexuals along with Communists as enemies of the state.... The U.S. Senate was busy investigating the suspicion that 'moral perverts' in the government were also undermining national security—going so far as to commission a study, Employment of Homosexuals and Other Sex Perverts in Government.

Carringer has argued that the film was crucially shaped by the Congressional inquiries, making Guy the stand-in for victims of the homophobic climate. "To all appearances Guy is the all-American stereotype, an athlete, unassuming despite his fame, conservatively dressed," wrote Carringer; he is "a man of indeterminate sexual identity found in circumstances making him vulnerable to being compromised." Hitchcock, who had drawn gay characters so sharply yet subtly in Rope in 1948, "drafted the left-leaning Cook... expressly because he was comfortable with sexually ambiguous characters."

=== Differences from the novel ===
Even before sewing up the rights for the novel, Hitchcock's mind was whirling with ideas about how to adapt it for the screen. He narrowed the geographic scope to the Northeast corridor, between Washington, D.C., and New York—the novel ranged through the southwest and Florida, among other locales. The scripting team added the tennis match—and the crosscutting with Bruno's storm drain travails in Metcalf—added the cigarette lighter, the Tunnel of Love, Miriam's eyeglasses; in fact, the amusement park is only a brief setting in the novel.

Hitchcock's biggest changes were in his two lead characters:

The character called Bruno Antony in the film is called Charles Anthony Bruno in the book. In the book, Bruno dies in a boating accident far removed from a merry-go-round.

In the novel, Guy Haines is not a tennis player, but rather a promising architect, and he does indeed go through with the murder of Bruno's father. In the movie, "Guy became a decent guy who refuses to carry out his part of the crazed bargain..." writes Patrick McGilligan, "to head off the censors." In the novel, Guy is pursued and entrapped by a tenacious detective.

The merry-go-round scene is not in the book, but is taken from the climax of Edmund Crispin's 1946 novel The Moving Toyshop. All the major elements of the scene—the two men struggling, the accidentally shot attendant, the out-of-control merry-go-round, the crawling under the moving merry-go-round to disable it—are present in Crispin's account, though he received no screen credit for it.

== Reception ==
=== Critical reception ===
Upon its release in 1951, Strangers on a Train received mixed reviews. Variety praised it, writing: "Performance-wise, the cast comes through strongly. Granger is excellent as the harassed young man innocently involved in murder. Roman's role as a nice, understanding girl is a switch for her, and she makes it warmly effective. Walker's role has extreme color, and he projects it deftly."

Conversely, Bosley Crowther of The New York Times criticized the film: "Mr. Hitchcock again is tossing a crazy murder story in the air and trying to con us into thinking that it will stand up without support. ... Perhaps there will be those in the audience who will likewise be terrified by the villain's darkly menacing warnings and by Mr. Hitchcock's sleekly melodramatic tricks. ... But, for all that, his basic premise of fear fired by menace is so thin and so utterly unconvincing that the story just does not stand." Leslie Halliwell felt that Hitchcock was "at his best" and that the film "makes superior suspense entertainment," but called the story "unsatisfactory."

In contrast, modern reviews have been overwhelmingly positive. On Rotten Tomatoes the film has an approval rating of 98% based on reviews from 52 critics, with an average rating of 8.80/10. The website's consensus reads, "A provocative premise and inventive set design lights the way for Hitchcock['s] diabolically entertaining masterpiece." Metacritic, which uses a weighted average, assigned the film a score of 88 out of 100, based on 15 critics, indicating "universal acclaim". Roger Ebert has called Strangers on a Train a "first-rate thriller" that he considers one of Hitchcock's five best films. He added the film in his Great Movies list. In 2012, The Guardian praised the film writing "Hitchcock's study of the guilt that taints the human condition is just one cinematic masterstroke after another".

David Keyes, writing at Cinemaphile in 2002, saw the film as a seminal entry in its genre: "Aside from its very evident approach as a crowd-pleasing popcorn flick, the movie is one of the original shells for identity-inspired mystery thrillers, in which natural human behavior is the driving force behind the true macabre rather than supernatural elements. Even classic endeavors like Fargo and A Simple Plan seem directly fueled by this concept..."

Almar Haflidason was effusive about Strangers on a Train in 2001 at the BBC website: "Hitchcock's favourite device of an ordinary man caught in an ever-tightening web of fear plunges Guy into one of the director's most fiendishly effective movies. Ordinary Washington locations become sinister hunting grounds that mirror perfectly the creeping terror that slowly consumes Guy, as the lethally smooth Bruno relentlessly pursues him to a frenzied climax. Fast, exciting, and woven with wicked style, this is one of Hitchcock's most efficient and ruthlessly delicious thrillers."

Patricia Highsmith's opinion of the film varied over time. She initially praised it, writing: "I am pleased in general. Especially with Bruno, who held the movie together as he did the book." Later in life, while still praising Robert Walker's performance as Bruno, she criticized the casting of Ruth Roman as Anne, Hitchcock's decision to turn Guy from an architect into a tennis player and the fact that Guy does not murder Bruno's father as he does in the novel.

=== Box office ===
According to Warner Bros' records, the film earned $1,788,000 domestically and $1,144,000 in foreign territories.

=== Accolades ===
Award	Category	Subject	Result
Academy Award	Best Cinematography	Robert Burks	Nominated
Directors Guild of America Award	Outstanding Directing – Feature Film	Alfred Hitchcock	Nominated
National Board of Review Award	Best Film	Alfred Hitchcock	Nominated

American Film Institute listed the film as #32 in AFI's 100 Years...100 Thrills.

== Alternative versions ==
An early preview edit of the film, sometimes labelled the "British" version although it was never released in Britain or anywhere else, includes some scenes either not in, or else different from, the film as released. According to biographer Charlotte Chandler (Lyn Erhard), Hitchcock himself did not like either the "British" or the "American" version:

Hitchcock told [Chandler] that the picture should have ended with Guy at the amusement park after he has been cleared of murdering his wife. He wanted the last line of the film to be Guy describing Bruno as "a very clever fellow". This ending, however, was not acceptable to Warner Bros.

In 1997, Warner released the film onto DVD as a double sided disc, with the "British" version on one side, and the "Hollywood" version on the reverse. Between the two versions of the film, the "British" version most prominently omits the final scene on the train. A two-disc DVD edition was released in 2004 containing both versions of the film, this time with the "British" version titled "Preview Version" (102:49 long) and the "Hollywood" version titled "Final Release Version" (100:40 long). The film was later made available on Blu-ray in 2012 with the same contents as the 2004 DVD edition.

== Legacy ==
Strangers on a Train was adapted for the radio program Lux Radio Theatre on two occasions: on December 3, 1951, with Ruth Roman, Frank Lovejoy and Ray Milland, and on April 12, 1954, with Virginia Mayo, Dana Andrews and Robert Cummings.

The film has been loosely remade several times and has inspired other productions:

- The 1969 film, Once You Kiss a Stranger stars Paul Burke and Carol Lynley. In this version, the psychopath is a woman who seduces the male protagonist, then offers to kill his chief rival in a professional golf tournament if he will reciprocate by killing her psychiatrist.
- The 1987 film Throw Momma from the Train by Danny DeVito was inspired by Strangers on a Train, which is also watched by DeVito's character in the film.
- A television film remake, Once You Meet a Stranger, was written and directed by Tommy Lee Wallace, and aired on CBS on September 25, 1996. The film switches the genders of the main characters from male to female, and stars Jacqueline Bisset and Theresa Russell.
- BBC Radio 4's Afternoon Play broadcast on September 29, 2011, was Strangers on a Film by Stephen Wyatt, which gives an imagined account of a series of meetings between Hitchcock (Clive Swift) and Raymond Chandler (Patrick Stewart), as they unsuccessfully attempt to create the screenplay for Strangers on a Train.
- The 2022 Netflix original Do Revenge has a plot inspired by Strangers on a Train. In the film, two classmates conspire to ruin each other's enemies as revenge.

In 2021, the film was selected for preservation in the United States National Film Registry by the Library of Congress as being "culturally, historically, or aesthetically significant". In 2022, Time Out ranked the film at No. 75 on their list of "The 100 best thriller films of all time".

== See also ==
- List of films featuring psychopaths and sociopaths
- Influence on Carol Burnett's Star on Hollywood Walk of Fame

== Bibliography ==
- Chandler, Charlotte (2006). It's Only a Movie: Alfred Hitchcock, A Personal Biography. New York: Applause Books. ISBN 978-1-55783-692-2.
- Ebert, Roger (2006). The Great Movies II. New York: Broadway Press. ISBN 978-0-7679-1986-9.
- McGilligan, Patrick (2004). Alfred Hitchcock: A Life in Darkness and Light. New York: Harper Perennial. ISBN 978-0-06-098827-2.
- Spoto, Donald (1983). The Dark Side of Genius: The Life of Alfred Hitchcock. New York: Ballantine Books. ISBN 0-345-31462-X.
- Sullivan, Jack (2006). Hitchcock's Music. New Haven: Yale University Press. ISBN 978-0-300-13618-0.
- Wood, Robin (2004). Marshall Deutelbaum; Leland A. Poage (eds.). A Hitchcock Reader. Hoboken, New Jersey: Wiley-Blackwell. ISBN 978-1-4051-5556-4.
