= The Bulgari Connection =

2000 novel by Fay Weldon

- First trade edition
- Author: Fay Weldon
- Language: English
- Genre: Novel
- Publisher: Atlantic Monthly Press
- Publication date: 2000
- Publication place: United Kingdom
- Media type: Print (Hardback & Paperback)
- Pages: 224 pp (first edition, hardback)
- ISBN: 0-00-712126-1 (first edition, hardback)
- OCLC: 59550660

The Bulgari Connection is a 2000 novel by Fay Weldon that became notorious for its commercial tie-in: in exchange for an undisclosed fee from the Italian jewellery company Bulgari, Weldon was required to mention the name of the jeweler at least 12 times - which was more than exceeded by the author. The 34 mentions appear in sentences such as "'A Bulgari necklace in the hand is worth two in the bush', said Doris" or "They snuggled together happily for a bit, all passion spent; and she met him at Bulgari that lunchtime". Such heavy use of product placement was not only a novelty in literature but also unprecedented for a published, established author (The Bulgari Connection was her 22nd novel), and a front-page article was published about it in The New York Times, quoting such writers as Rick Moody, J. G. Ballard, Michael Chabon, and Jeanette Winterson.

The story concerns a character named Grace McNab Salt, and her re-integration into high society after ending a term in prison that she served for attempting to run her husband's mistress Doris Dubois over with her car.
