= Margaret Jepson =

English author

- Born: 3 August 1907; England, United Kingdom
- Died: 11 January 2003 (aged 95); London, England, United Kingdom
- Occupations: Author, essayist, playwright
- Children: Jane Birkinshaw (daughter), Fay Weldon (daughter)
- Relatives: Edgar Jepson (father), Selwyn Jepson (brother)

Margaret Jepson (3 August 1907 – 11 January 2003) was an English writer and artist, also known by her married name Margaret Birkinshaw and by her pen name Pearl Bellairs. Her daughter, Fay Weldon, and father, Edgar Jepson, were both novelists.

== Personal life ==
Margaret Jepson was born in 1907, the daughter of mystery/detective author and critic Edgar Jepson and Frieda Jepson, a concert pianist who was the daughter of the musician Henry Holmes. Margaret's brother was the writer Selwyn Jepson. She attended London City College and Ealing Technical College Library School and the Slade School of Art.

In 1928 she married a young doctor, Frank Thornton Birkinshaw, who was a veteran of World War I. In 1929 their daughter Jane was born, followed by another daughter in 1931, whom Margaret named Franklin Birkinshaw, but who is better known as feminist writer Fay Weldon. In 1930 the Birkinshaws emigrated to New Zealand, where Frank found a position at a practice in Christchurch.

Margaret was beautiful, bohemian, fey. She read horoscopes, painted tarot cards, saw visions of angels in the park, and wrote novels under the nom de plume Pearl Bellairs – the name of the vapid novelist in Aldous Huxley's Crome Yellow. She was singularly unsuited to being a New Zealand doctor's wife.

— Barber, Lynn, World in Acton: Lynn Barber reviews Auto da Fay by Fay Weldon

In 1936 Margaret and Frank agreed to separate, later divorcing in 1940. She returned alone to London on a cargo ship, planning to send for her children as soon as possible. When her husband threatened to take his daughters to South Africa, she returned to New Zealand to collect them. She began writing romance novels and stories that were published as serials to support her daughters. World War II forced her to find other work. She took a variety of jobs, such as painting ladies' powder-boxes. Along with her mother, who joined her in 1942, she worked in her own small ad agency, writing copy and working in film. She also secretly scratched away at her "magnum opus", a treatise on morality and aesthetics that according to her daughter's autobiography ran to "thousands of overwritten pages, which would get in a hopeless muddle on the kitchen table".

In 1946, when the war was over, Margaret, Frieda, and Margaret's daughters returned to England on the MV Rangatini. Margaret and the children moved to West Cornwall. Her obituary in The Times states that she considered this to be one of the worst mistakes of her life, because it led to her daughter Jane being introduced to the printer Guido Morris, who she later married.

In the 1960s, her daughter Jane was abandoned by her husband, Guido Morris, suffered from mental illness and later died from brain cancer in 1969 at the age of 40, leaving behind three children. Margaret took over the care of her grandchildren.

In 2000, Jepson broke her hip, after which she moved into a residential home, then a nursing home where she died.

Jepson features as a character in her daughter Fay Weldon's novel Chalcot Crescent (2010).

== Career ==
Jepson authored her first novel with her father, Edgar Jepson, in 1932 (Miss Amagee in Africa) before writing her first solo novel, Via Panama, which was published in 1934. Although praised by both George Bernard Shaw and HG Wells, it caused an uproar at the time and was a source of embarrassment to her husband. Her second novel was Velvet and Steel. She also wrote serialised novels under the pseudonym Pearl Bellairs.

According to her daughter Fay Weldon, Margaret's father stated that she was a better writer than either him or his son Selwyn, citing her novel Via Panama as proof.

== Bibliography ==
=== Serialised stories ===
- The Abandoned Lady, The 20-Story Magazine (April 1931)
- The Cruise of the Betsy Pringle (with Edgar Jepson), The 20-Story Magazine (September 1930)
- The Foolishness of Mr Amagee (with Edgar Jepson), The Strand Magazine (October 1928)
- The Danger Trail (December 1928)
- The House with the Clean Face, The 20-Story Magazine (December 1932)
- "The March of Progress", The Strand Magazine (September 1929)
- The Strand Magazine Overseas Edition (October 1929)
- Miss Amagee and the Sick Kitten (with Edgar Jepson), The Strand Magazine (April 1929)
- Miss Amagee Conspires (with Edgar Jepson), The Strand Magazine (June 1929)
- Miss Amagee Sells a Pup (with Edgar Jepson), The Saturday Evening Post (March 1928)
- The Strand Magazine (April 1928)
- The Monkey Puzzle, Britannia and Eve (January 1932)
- Mr Amagee Vaccinates (with Edgar Jepson), The Strand Magazine (August 1929)
- The Painted Jade (with Edgar Jepson), The Strand Magazine (May 1928)
- Wedding Present, Fact & Fiction (5 November 1934)
- They Say She Killed Him, The Hawick News (7 April to 7 July 1939)
- The Thruster, The Hawick News (12 March to 4 June 1943)

=== Novels ===
- Miss Amagee in Africa, 1932, Margaret and Edgar Alfred Jepson.
- Via Panama, Hamish Hamilton (London, England), 1934.
- Velvet and Steel, Herbert Jenkins (London, England), 1935.
- The Cups of Alexander, Herbert Jenkins (London, England), 1937.
- Love Spurned, 1948.
- Christabel, 1950.
