= Stage Fright (1950 film) =

1950 film by Alfred Hitchcock

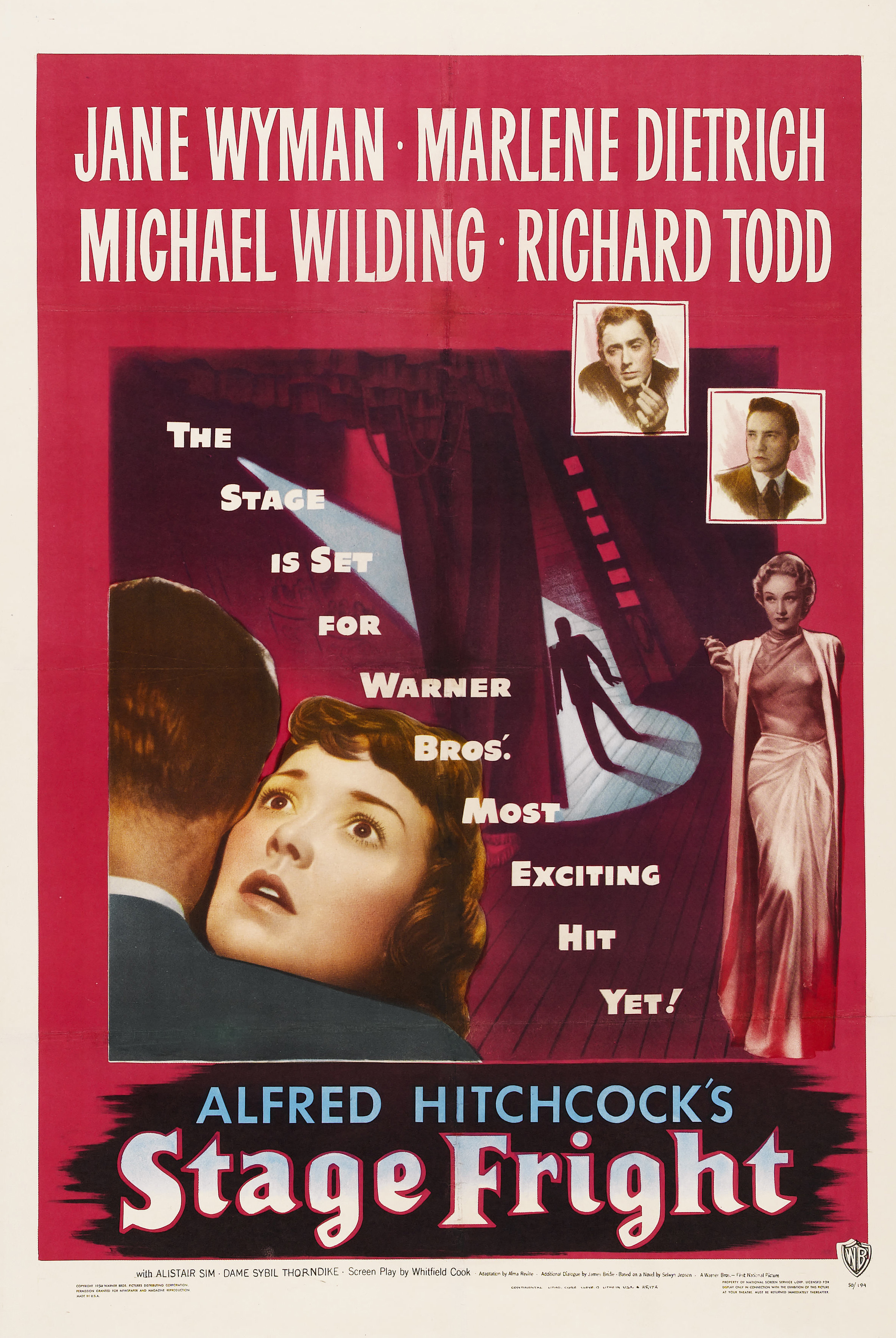
- Theatrical release poster
- Directed by: Alfred Hitchcock
- Screenplay by: Whitfield Cook; Alma Reville (Note: Adaptation); James Bridie (Note: Additional dialogue)
- Based on: Man Running; 1947 novel by Selwyn Jepson
- Produced by: Alfred Hitchcock
- Starring: Jane Wyman; Marlene Dietrich; Michael Wilding; Richard Todd; Alastair Sim; Sybil Thorndike
- Cinematography: Wilkie Cooper
- Edited by: E. B. Jarvis
- Music by: Leighton Lucas
- Production company: Transatlantic Pictures
- Distributed by: Warner Bros. Pictures
- Release dates: 23 February 1950 (New York City); 26 May 1950 (London)
- Running time: 110 minutes
- Country: United Kingdom
- Language: English
- Budget: $1.4 million
- Box office: $1.9 million

Stage Fright is a 1950 British thriller film noir directed and produced by Alfred Hitchcock and starring Jane Wyman, Marlene Dietrich, Michael Wilding and Richard Todd. The cast also features Alastair Sim, Sybil Thorndike, Kay Walsh, Hitchcock's daughter Pat Hitchcock in her film debut, and Joyce Grenfell in a vignette.

The story was adapted for the screen by Whitfield Cook and Alma Reville (the director's wife), with additional dialogue by James Bridie, based on the 1947 novel Man Running by Selwyn Jepson.

== Plot ==
Eve Gill is an aspiring actress at the Royal Academy of Dramatic Art (RADA) in London. She is interrupted in rehearsal by her friend and crush, Jonathan Cooper, the secret lover of flamboyant stage actress and singer Charlotte Inwood. Via a flashback, he says Charlotte visited him after killing her husband; she was wearing a bloodstained dress. Jonathan claims he went back to her house for another dress but was seen by Nellie Goode, Charlotte's Cockney maid and dresser. He escaped the police and needs help.

Eve takes him to her father's house on the coast to hide. Commodore Gill notices that the blood on Charlotte's dress has been smeared on deliberately; he and Eve think that Charlotte framed Jonathan. Jonathan angrily destroys the dress and, thus, the most useful piece of evidence.

Eve starts to investigate. She hears Nellie Goode boasting about her newfound notoriety in a bar. While she is there, Eve meets Detective Inspector Wilfred O Smith, and they become friendly. Eve then poses as a reporter; she bribes Nellie to tell Charlotte she is ill and introduce her cousin "Doris Tinsdale" as a replacement. Using her acting skills, Eve becomes "Doris" and starts working for Charlotte. Eve discovers Charlotte is having an affair with her manager Freddie Williams.

Eve and "Ordinary" Smith become more friendly. When Smith visits Charlotte, Eve has to disguise the fact that she is also "Doris", the maid. Smith makes a courtship visit to Eve and her mother at home, where the Commodore drops subtle hints that Jonathan has left the seaside house.

Despite her widowed status, Charlotte continues to perform her West End musical show. Jonathan comes to her dressing room, asking her to accompany him abroad. She casually tells him no, but he says he still has the bloodstained dress. The police search for Jonathan and Eve again helps him escape. He hides at the Gills' London residence. He is grateful to Eve, but she is starting to fall in love with Detective Smith.

Smith and Eve kiss in a taxi on the way to the RADA garden party, where Nellie Goode confronts Eve, demanding more blackmail money. Eve does not have enough, so Eve's father comes to give Nellie more cash. Freddie Williams spots Eve (thinking she is "Doris") and orders her to help Charlotte, who is to sing onstage in a tent. During the performance, Commodore Gill gets a small boy to carry a doll wearing a bloodstained dress onto the stage as Charlotte sings "La Vie en rose". Disturbed, Charlotte collapses, and "Doris" has to help.

Seeing this, Smith confronts Eve and the Commodore, but Eve proclaims her true affection for Smith as well as Jonathan's innocence. They persuade Smith to set Charlotte up. Once the theatre has closed, they use a hidden microphone, and "Doris" tells Charlotte she has the bloodstained dress. Smith and his men listen using the theatre loudspeakers. Charlotte admits planning her husband's death but says that Jonathan actually committed the murder. Charlotte offers Eve £10,000 to keep quiet.

Eve sees that Jonathan has been brought to the theatre by the police, but he escapes. Charlotte realises her conversation with Eve was broadcast to the detectives and that she will be charged as an accessory to murder. Detective Smith tells the Commodore that Jonathan really did kill Mr Inwood and that Jonathan had killed before, though he got off on a plea of self-defence.

Hiding below the stage, Jonathan confesses to Eve that Charlotte goaded him into killing her husband. His flashback story was all lies, and he was the one who smeared more blood onto the dress. He alludes to killing Eve to justify a plea for insanity in court. Eve pretends to help Jonathan escape but locks him onto the stage and alerts the police about his presence. As Jonathan is pursued from all directions and cornered, he is killed by the stage's falling safety curtain.

== Cast ==
- Jane Wyman as Eve Gill
- Marlene Dietrich as Charlotte Inwood
- Michael Wilding as Wilfred "Ordinary" Smith
- Richard Todd as Jonathan Cooper
- Alastair Sim as Commodore Gill
- Sybil Thorndike as Mrs Gill
- Kay Walsh as Nellie Goode
- Miles Malleson as Mr Fortesque
- Hector MacGregor as Freddie Williams
- Joyce Grenfell as 'Lovely Ducks'
- André Morell as Inspector Byard
- Patricia Hitchcock as Chubby Bannister (Note: Patricia Hitchcock also appears as a driving double for Wyman.)
- Ballard Berkeley as Sergeant Mellish
- Arthur Howard as Groves, Charlotte's Butler (uncredited)
- Alfie Bass as stagehand (uncredited)
- Gordon Bell as chauffeur (uncredited)
- Lionel Jeffries as RADA student (uncredited)

== Production ==
Though Hitchcock had lived and worked in Hollywood since 1939, this mystery thriller, which is mixed with humour, was made in London locations. The only members of the cast who are not British are the two top-billed stars: Wyman and Dietrich.

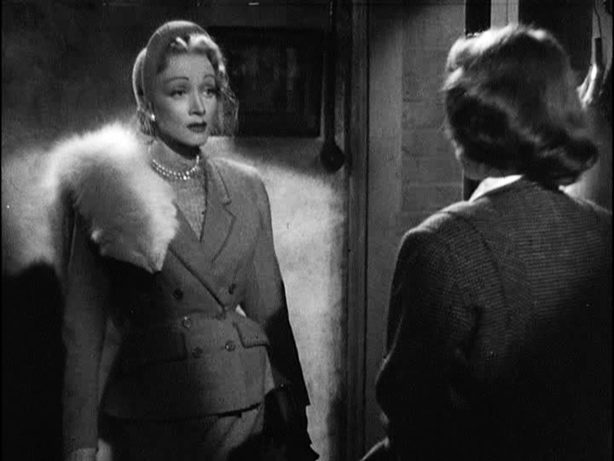
Dietrich (left) in a costume by Christian Dior

Dietrich's costumes were designed by Christian Dior, and the production featured a Cole Porter song, "The Laziest Gal in Town", performed by Dietrich in a sultry fashion. Dietrich also begins a performance of Edith Piaf's "La Vie en rose" twice, the first being heard before a scene change and later her character is unable to finish it after being startled by a Boy Scout bringing a blood-stained doll to her. Dietrich was allowed an unprecedented control of her shots by Hitchcock during the filming. When asked during the filming about working with the famously controlling, and technically adept Dietrich, Hitchcock replied, "Everything is fine. Miss Dietrich has arranged the whole thing. She has told them exactly where to place the lights and how to photograph her." He later said of Dietrich, "Marlene was a professional star. She was also a professional cameraman, art director, editor, costume designer, hairdresser, makeup woman, composer, producer and director."

Stage Fright garnered some adverse publicity upon its initial release due to the "lying flashback" seen near the beginning of the film. However, some film critics, including those of Cahiers du cinéma, see the flashback as simply being an illustration of one person's version of the events: the events as recounted by the character whose voice-over we hear, which was presumably Hitchcock's intention. Hitchcock realised that the scene might be misinterpreted after seeing the film edited together, but it was too late to change; he would later maintain that it was one of his greatest mistakes. Alternatively, modern filmmaker and Hitchcock devotee Richard Franklin described it as "almost cutting edge mystery filmmaking".

The film has a few extra-long takes, reminiscent of those that Hitchcock used in Rope (1948) and Under Capricorn (1949), both films produced by Hitchcock for Transatlantic Pictures in partnership with Sidney Bernstein and released by Warner Bros. Pictures. Stage Fright was originally intended to be a Transatlantic release, but became a Warners release instead.

According to the biography of Dietrich by her daughter Maria Riva, Dietrich was not particularly fond of Jane Wyman, perhaps because they were such opposites.

Howard Maxford, author of The A–Z of Hitchcock: The Ultimate Reference Guide, notes that some aspects of the Edith Thompson and Frederick Bywaters case have similarities to the plot of Stage Fright.

== Differences between the film and the novel ==
Although Stage Fright is based on Selwyn Jepson's novel Man Running (also known as Outrun the Constable), it differs in some ways. In the original story, Freddie Williams is the actual murderer.

== Hitchcock's cameo ==
Alfred Hitchcock's cameo is a signature occurrence in most of his films. In Stage Fright, he can be seen 39 minutes into the film as a man on the street turning to look at Eve as she rehearses her scripted introduction speech to Mrs Inwood.

In the 4 June 1950 issue of The New York Times, Hitchcock stated:

"In Stage Fright, I have been told that my performance is quite juicy. I have been told this with a certain air of tolerance, implying that I have now achieved the maximum limits of directorial ham in the movie sandwich. It isn't true. There may have been a 'MacGuffin' in my film appearance, but not a ham."

== Reception ==
=== Critical reaction ===
Bosley Crowther of The New York Times wrote that Hitchcock "and his writers have contrived to give a fine cast of actors some slick and entertaining things to do. But we must quietly advise you that these things, while amusing separately, build up very little sustained excitement or suspense. They are simply a wild accumulation of clever or colorful episodes, tending for the most part to the comic, without any real anxiety." John McCarten of The New Yorker agreed, writing that "the picture doesn't lack for comic touches, but none of its episodes ties in very closely with the succeeding one, and the result is disappointing." Variety printed a more positive review, reporting that Hitchcock "has a choice cast to put through its paces, and there's not a bad performance anywhere. The dialog has purpose, either for a chuckle or a thrill, and the pace is good despite the 110 minutes of footage."

Harrison's Reports called it "a rambling murder thriller that wavers constantly between comedy that is delightfully funny and melodrama that is rarely more than moderately exciting. The overall result is a spotty entertainment that is too dragged out to keep one's interest constantly alive." Richard L. Coe of The Washington Post wrote that there were "so many beguiling people and moments" in the film "that it's curious the picture as a whole isn't better." The Monthly Film Bulletin wrote: "Stage Fright is not without effective moments, reminding us how Hitchcock once excelled in the simple melodrama with ordinary, naturalistic backgrounds; but too much of it has the heavy, corpulent quality that made Rope and in particular Under Capricorn so lifeless and unreal." The New Republic's original review was extremely favourable, calling Stage Fright "one of the most entertaining homicidal comedies of his career." But its later critic Stanley Kauffmann described it as "abominable". It was selected as one of the Top 10 Films of 1950 chosen annually by the National Board of Review of Motion Pictures.

Contemporary reviews of the film have been mostly positive. On the review aggregator website Rotten Tomatoes, Stage Fright has an approval rating of 91% based on 21 reviews, with an average score of 7.10/10.

The film has been shown on the Turner Classic Movies show Noir Alley with Eddie Muller.

=== Box office ===
Trade papers called the film a "notable box office attraction" in British cinemas in 1950. According to Warner Bros' accounts, the film earned $1,012,000 domestically and $896,000 internationally.
