= Habits of the House =

2012 novel by Fay Weldon

- Author: Fay Weldon
- Language: English
- Genre: Novel
- Publication date: 2012
- Publication place: United Kingdom

Habits of the House is a 2012 novel by Fay Weldon set in 1899 London society. It is the first book of the "Love & Inheritance" trilogy. The main plot follows the Earl of Dilberne's son Arthur who needs to marry for money. The primary candidate for such is the daughter of a Chicago meat baron, Minnie O'Brien, who is looking for a spouse in England after ruining her reputation in America. The novel is followed by Long Live the King and finally The New Countess.

== Critical reception ==
Clare Clark, writing for The Guardian says the novel "has some funny moments" and calls it an "easy read, but little of it sticks." Jan Stuart, writing for The New York Times says Weldon's "flair for capturing the grudging envy shared by the British and their colonial counterparts is worth more than its market value in fool’s gold."
