= Man Running (novel) =

First edition (publ. Macdonald & Co.)

Man Running is a thriller novel by Selwyn Jepson, originally published in serial form in Collier's magazine in 1947. In 1948, it was published in hardcover in the United States, as well as the United Kingdom (as Outrun the Constable). In 1950, it was published in paperback as Killer by Proxy.

The story involves a drama student who tries to help a friend avoid being framed for murder. The Alfred Hitchcock film Stage Fright (1950) was based on this story, though some of its key details were changed.
