= Wicked Women =

1995 short story collection by Fay Weldon

- First edition
- Author: Fay Weldon
- Language: English
- Genre: Fiction
- Published: 1995 (HarperCollins); 1996 (Atlantic Monthly)
- Publication place: UK
- ISBN: 978-0871137371

Wicked Women is a collection of short stories by author Fay Weldon, published in the UK in 1995. The stories pursue the themes of relationships, family and love, with the humor and wit that is typical of Weldon's style. The book won the PEN/Macmillan Silver Pen Award in 1996.

== Stories ==
Weldon populates her stories with people suffering from detachment, unequal power relations, and social irreverence. Considered a strong feminist writer, Weldon usually focuses on women navigating the dangers and difficulties of marriage and domesticity, as she does in Wicked Women as well, but in this book she find everyone wicked: Men, women, children, therapists, and even supernatural beings.

The stories are divided by subject, as follows:

- Tales of Wicked Women
  - End of the Line
  - Run and Ask Daddy If He Has Any More Money
  - In the Great War (II)
  - Not Even a Blood Relation
- Tales of Wicked Men
  - Wasted Lives
  - Love Amongst the Artists
  - Leda and the Swan
- 'Tales of Wicked Children
  - Tale of Timothy Bagshott
  - Valediction
- From the Other Side
  - Through a Dustbin, Darkly
  - A Good Sound Marriage
  - Web Central
- Of Love, Pain and Good Cheer
  - Pains
  - A Question of Timing
  - Red on Black
  - Knock-Knock
- Going to the Therapist
  - Santa Claus' New Clothes
  - Baked Alaska
  - The Pardoner
  - Heat Haze

== Reception ==
The collection was well-received by critics. According to the Publishers Weekly review, "These 20 saucy tales prove that the worst varieties of human pretension and evil are often the most entertaining, especially in the hands of an expert vivisectionist like Weldon." The Kirkus review stated that, "Both sexes and all ages come in for some merry tweaking by this master of sexual satire--making this outing a familiar pleasure for old fans and a thoroughly satisfying introduction for newcomers." New York Times reviewer Deborah Mason writes, "Weldon's wrap-ups are eloquent and absolute. They are born of her belief in the dogged persistence of genetic bonds and in an uncompromising universe of clear rights and wrongs with their own inevitable consequences. With Wicked Women, Weldon has become one of the most cunning moral satirists of our time. In her rueful stories, justice is done -- whether we like it or not."

Wicked Women won the PEN/Macmillan Silver Pen Award in 1996, and became a 1997 New York Times Notable Book of the Year.

== Publication history ==
Hardcover

- HarperCollings / Flamingo, London 1995; ISBN 9780002239219
- Publisher Grove Press / Atlantic Monthly Press, New York 1997; ISBN 9780871136817

Paperback

- Flamingo / HarperCollins, London 1996; ISBN 9780006550181
- Atlantic Monthly Press, New York 1999; ISBN 9780871137371
- Avalon Travel Publishing, Chicago 1999; ISBN 9780871137371
- Flamingo / HarperCollins, London 2008; ISBN 9780007291885

Audio book

- HarperColling (Audio cassettes), London 1995; ISBN 9780001050044

E-book

- Open Road Media, April 16, 2013; ISBN 9781480412453
