= Czenzi Ormonde =

American novelist (1909–2004)

- Born: March 3, 1906; Tacoma, Washington, United States
- Died: July 24, 2004 (aged 98); Hayden, Idaho, United States
- Occupations: Writer, screenwriter

Czenzi Ormonde (March 3, 1906 – July 24, 2004) was an American novelist and screenwriter.

After moving as a teenager to Los Angeles, she worked at several Hollywood studios as a secretary, working with Samuel Goldwyn. There, she started writing and publishing short stories in magazines. In 1948, she published her first novel, Laughter from Downstairs, based on her childhood memories.

In 1950, she met Alfred Hitchcock who was having trouble recruiting a writer for the screenplay of Strangers on a Train. After clashing with the original writer, Raymond Chandler, Ben Hecht was approached but unable to take the work. Being too busy, he suggested his assistant Ormonde. Ormonde produced much of the screenplay for the movie but was not credited as the main screenwriter, Raymond Chandler retaining the main credit despite most of his work not appearing in the movie. Hitchcock biographer Patrick McGilligan describes Ormonde and Barbara Keon collaborating on the screenplay; biographer Donald Spoto adds Alma Reville, Hitchcock's wife, as a third collaborator.

Ormonde wrote a second novel, Solomon and the Queen of Sheba in 1954.

She also wrote the screenplay for the movie Step Down to Terror and an animated version of the 1001 Arabian Nights.
