= Square Club (writers) =

Early 20th-century monthly dining club of writers in London, England

The Square Club for writers was a monthly dining club that met in London, from 1908/9 to about 1913/4, and included many of the established younger-generation authors. The founders included Edward Garnett, G. K. Chesterton and Conal O'Riordan. It was just one of a number of similar London groups (Garnett had another Soho circle that was distinct); it was perhaps the most substantial such grouping of its time, with a concentration of those enjoying professional success. The name was for Mr. Square, the philosopher character in Henry Fielding's Tom Jones.

Others who participated included J. D. Beresford, Walter de la Mare, John Galsworthy, W. H. Hudson, Roger Ingpen, Edgar Jepson, Arthur Machen, John Masefield, and Edward Thomas. Ezra Pound on arriving in London found it easy to make contacts through the club, but less easy to convince those there through his flamboyance. Jepson introduced Ford Madox Ford.
