= Puffball (novel) =

1980 novel by Fay Weldon

- First edition (UK)
- Author: Fay Weldon
- Original title: Puffball
- Language: English
- Genre: Supernatural drama
- Publisher: Hodder & Stoughton (UK); Summit Books (US)
- Publication date: 1980
- Publication place: England

Puffball is a 1980 supernatural drama novel by English author Fay Weldon.

== Plot ==
Liffey and Richard, a young London couple who move to the country with the expectation of having children. Their neighbours are Mabs and Tucker, a farming family with five children of their own. Mabs, jealous of the newcomers' easy life, sends Tucker to sleep with Liffey while Richard is away, priming her with an herbal aphrodisiac first. She becomes angry, however, when Liffey becomes pregnant and she finds that she herself is suddenly unable to conceive. Incorrectly believing the father of the child might be Tucker, Mabs attempts to abort the child by sneaking herbs into Liffey's tea and food. The unborn child, however, mystically takes charge and gives Liffey directions, saving her life and its own. Once the baby is born, Mabs sees the resemblance to Richard and, now pregnant herself, abandons her anger towards the couple.

== Reception ==
Critic Mary Cantwell reviewed the novel in The New York Times Book Review, writing, "A Weldon novel is invariably a pleasure. Fay Weldon is also a very clever writer about women ...she speaks for the female experience without becoming doctrinaire and without the dogged humorlessness that has characterized so much feminist writing... She has not yet achieved the miracle of creating a character whose life goes on after the book has ended; since her women serve as vessels for her perceptions, they have no existence apart from their maker. Still, Fay Weldon enchants. If one wants more from her, it is because she is so obviously capable of doing more."

== Film adaptation ==
The novel was made into a film in 2007, directed by Nicolas Roeg and starring Donald Sutherland, Miranda Richardson and Rita Tushingham. The script was written by Weldon's son, Dan Weldon. Fay Weldon is said to have approved of the finished film upon seeing it.

A television adaptation is currently in the works.
