= Lesley Pearse =

British novelist

- Born: February 24, 1945 (age 81); U.K.
- Occupation: Novelist
- Known for: Writing romantic novels
- Children: 3

Lesley Pearse (born 24 February 1945) is a British novelist, with global sales of over 10 million copies. She started writing at the age of 35, but was not published until she was 48.

Pearse lives in Devon, England. She has three daughters and three grandchildren. Her second husband was in a rock band during the 1960s.

In February 2024, an autobiography, The Long and Winding Road, was published.

== Novels ==
- Georgia (1993)
- Tara (1994)
- Charity (1995)
- Ellie (1996)
- Camellia (1997)
- Rosie (1998)
- Charlie (1999)
- Never Look Back (2000)
- Trust Me (2001)
- Father Unknown (2002)
- Till We Meet Again (2002)
- Remember Me (2003)
- Secrets (2004)
- A Lesser Evil (2005)
- Hope (2006)
- Faith (2007)
- Gypsy (2008)
- Stolen (2010)
- Belle (2011)
- The Promise (2012)
- Forgive Me (2013)
- Survivor (2014)
- Without a Trace (2015)
- Dead to Me (2016)
- The Woman in the Wood (2017)
- The House Across the Street (2018)
- You'll Never See Me Again (2019)
- Liar (2020)
- Suspects (2021)
- Deception (2022)
- Betrayal (2023)
- The Girl with the Suitcase (2025)
