= Leggere Donna =

Italian feminist cultural magazine

- Editor: Luciana Tufani
- Categories: Book review magazine
- Publisher: Luciana Tufani publishing
- Founded: 1980; 46 years ago
- Country: Italy
- Based in: Ferrara
- Language: Italian
- Website: Official website
- ISSN: 1122-4975
- OCLC: 17939853

Leggere Donna (Italian: Reading Woman) is an Italian feminist cultural magazine which features reviews about women-related literary work and about books written by women. The magazine began publication in 1980. It has been published by Luciana Tufani publishing since its inception, and as of 2011 its editor was Luciana Tufani. The headquarters of the magazine is in Ferrara.
