= Isabel Wolff =

British novelist

- Born: Warwickshire, England
- Education: University of Cambridge (BA, English)
- Occupation: Novelist
- Writing career
- Genre: Chick lit

Isabel Wolff is an English novelist in the Chick lit genre. Aside from being a novelist, Wolff has worked as a radio producer and reporter for the BBC World Service.

== Early and personal life ==
Wolff was born in Warwickshire, England. She graduated from Cambridge University with a Bachelor of Arts (BA) in English. She currently lives in Islington, London and has a home on the Roseland Peninsula.

== Work ==
Wolff's first novel The Trials of Tiffany Trott came about in 1997 when The Daily Telegraph asked her to write a comic column. Trott's persona is a British working-girl. HarperCollins commissioned Wolff to turn the column into a book.

Her 2009 book A Vintage Affair was an Amazon.co.uk 'Best of the Year' title that year. The same book was also on the short list for the 2011 American Library Association's The Reading List for Women Fiction. A Vintage Affair is also her first novel that reached a wider readership, including being published for the United States book market.

Kirkus Reviews wrote that in The Very Picture of You (2011), Wolff handled multiple plotlines, balancing the stories of "betrayal, deception and remorse" told in the novel in a skillful manner.

Wolff's novel Ghostwritten (2014) deals with the largely unknown issue of civilians from South East Asia, many of them women and children, who were sent to live in concentration camps run by the Japanese during World War II. The story is very much about "childhood traumas," such as losing a sibling.

== Publications ==
- The Trials of Tiffany Trott, Onyx (New York, NY), 1998 ISBN 978-0451408884
- The Making of Minty Malone, Onyx (New York, NY), 1999 ISBN 978-0451409256
- Out of the Blue, HarperCollins (London, England), 2001, Red Dress Ink (New York, NY), 2003 ISBN 978-0778313663
- Rescuing Rose, HarperCollins (London, England), 2002 ISBN 978-0753178645
- Behaving Badly, HarperCollins (London, England), 2003 ISBN 978-0778312840
- A Question of Love, HarperCollins (London, England), 2005 ISBN 978-0007178346
- Forget Me Not, HarperCollins (New York, NY), 2007 ISBN 978-0007178308
- A Vintage Affair, Bantam Books (New York, NY), 2009 ISBN 978-0553807837
- The Very Picture of You, Bantam Books (New York, NY), 2011 ISBN 978-0553807844
- Ghostwritten (in UK) or Shadows Over Paradise (in US), HarperCollins (London, England), 2014 ISBN 978-0007455065
