= Whitfield Cook =

American writer (1909–2003)

- Born: George Whitfield Cook III; April 9, 1909; Montclair, New Jersey, United States
- Died: November 12, 2003 (aged 94); Lyme, Connecticut, United States
- Occupation: Writer
- Spouse: Elizabeth Heiskell Cook
- Children: George W. Cook IV
- Relatives: John N. Heiskell (father-in-law)

George Whitfield Cook III (April 9, 1909 – November 12, 2003) was an American writer of screenplays, stage plays, short stories and novels, best known for his contributions to two Alfred Hitchcock films, Stage Fright and Strangers on a Train. He also wrote scripts for several TV series, including Suspense, Climax! and Playhouse 90.

== Life and career ==
George Whitfield Cook III was born on April 9, 1909, in Montclair, New Jersey, the son of engineer George Whitfield Cook Jr., and his wife, the former Hortense Heyse. He began writing short stories as a child and later cited Walter de la Mare and Virginia Woolf as major influences. He attended and graduated from the Yale School of Drama.

Cook began his career as a writer in the late thirties with stories in The American Mercury, Story and Cosmopolitan. One of these stories, "The Unfaithful," won an O. Henry Award in the "Best First-Published" category in 1943.

In the early forties, Cook wrote a series of stories for Redbook about a precocious teenage girl named Violet who helps to untangle her father's love life. In 1944 he dramatized these in a play called Violet. The play, which Cook also directed, only ran on Broadway for 23 performances, but it starred Patricia Hitchcock as Violet, and brought Cook to the attention of her father, Alfred Hitchcock.

In 1945, Cook headed to Hollywood, where he was partnered with Ann Morrison Chapin on a trio of film scripts that starred June Allyson. He made his debut with the romantic comedy The Sailor Takes a Wife (1945) and followed with the psychological drama The Secret Heart (1946) and the wartime romance High Barbaree (1947).

Cook then worked with Hitchcock and his wife, Alma Reville, on Stage Fright (1950) and Strangers on a Train (1951). Cook's treatment for Strangers on a Train is usually given credit for heightening the film's homoerotic subtext (only hinted at in the novel) and the softening of the villain, Bruno, from the coarse alcoholic of the book into a dapper, charming mama's boy.

For his work on Stage Fright, Cook was nominated for a 1951 Edgar Allan Poe Award in the Best Motion Picture category.

For the remainder of the 1950s, Cook worked in television, contributing scripts to series such as Studio One in Hollywood, Suspense, Front Row Center, Playhouse 90, Colgate Theatre, Climax!, Have Gun – Will Travel and 77 Sunset Strip.

Cook wrote four books:

- Violet, 1942, a collection of the Redbook stories
- Roman Comedy: An Impolite Extravaganza (published in paperback as A Night with Mr. Primrose), 1951, a novel about a film star who travels to Italy to make a movie
- Taxi to Dubrovnik, 1981, a novel about three idle, vacationing Americans traveling by hired car from Athens to Dubrovnik.
- A Choice of Disguises, 2003, a novel

== Legacy ==
In the 2012 film Hitchcock, Cook was portrayed by Danny Huston as a charmer trying to persuade Hitchcock's wife, Alma Reville, into having an extra-marital affair during the filming of Psycho. Several published Hitchcock biographies document this as accurate from Cook's private diaries.

New Dramatists annually bestows a Whitfield Cook Award to a playwright for the best unproduced, unpublished play, as determined by a jury.
