= Product placement =

Marketing technique

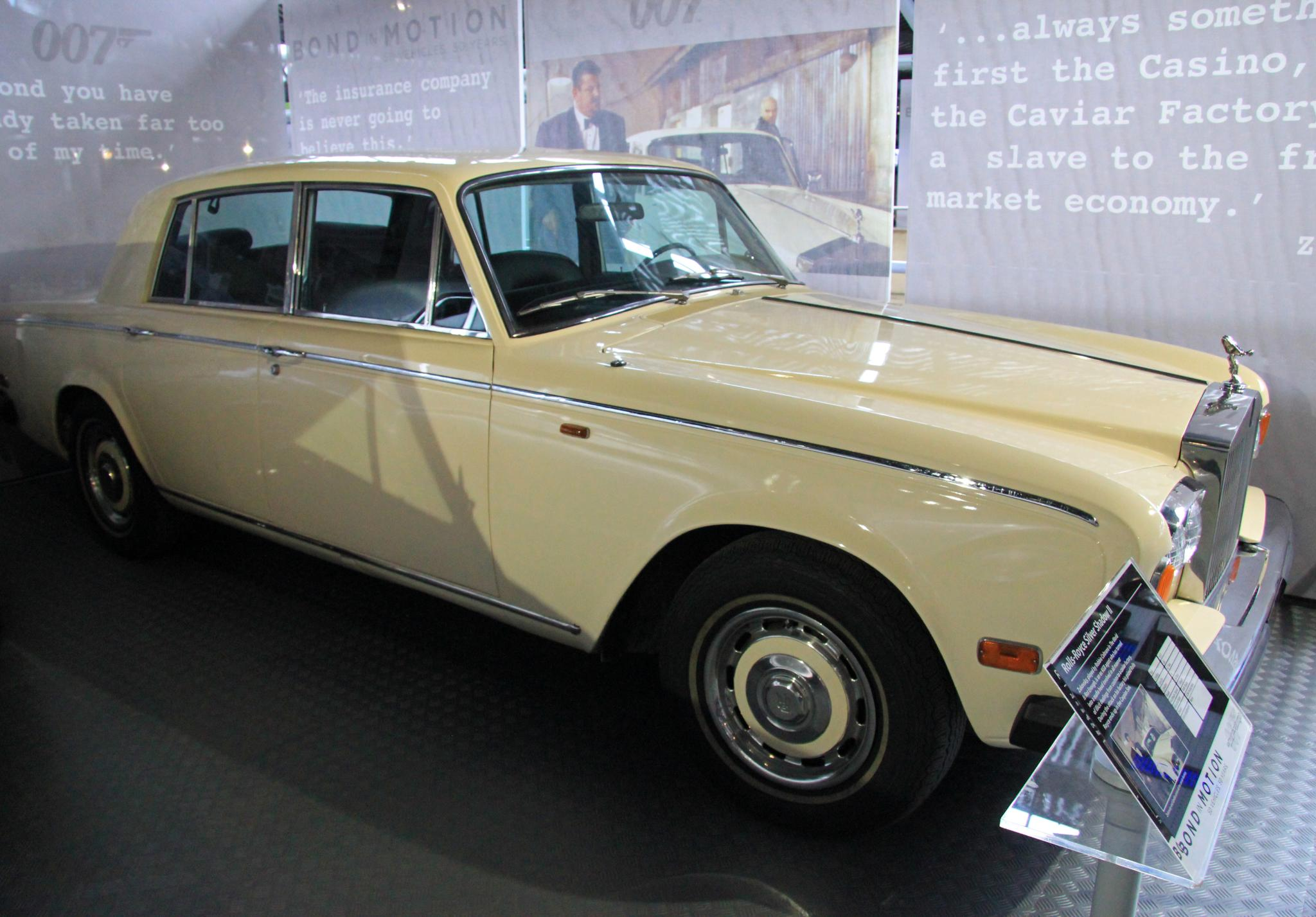
The Rolls-Royce Silver Shadow featured in the James Bond spy-thriller film The World Is Not Enough at National Motor Museum, Beaulieu, in 2012

Product placement, also known as embedded marketing, is a marketing technique where references to specific brands or products are incorporated into another work, such as a film or television program, with specific promotional intent. Much of this is done by loaning products, especially when expensive items, such as vehicles, are involved. In 2021, the agreements between brand owners and films and television programs were worth more than US$20 billion.

Incorporated into works to maintain a feeling of realism or be a subject of commentary, product placement is the deliberate incorporation of references to a brand or product in exchange for compensation. Product placements may range from unobtrusive appearances within an environment, to prominent integration and acknowledgement of the product within the work. When deliberate product placement is not announced to the viewer, it is considered a form of covert advertising.

Common categories of products used for placements include automobiles and consumer electronics. Works produced by vertically integrated companies (such as Sony) may use placements to promote their other divisions as a form of corporate synergy.

During the 21st century, the use of product placement on television has grown, particularly to combat the wider use of digital video recorders that can skip traditional commercial breaks, as well as to engage with younger demographics. Digital editing technology is also being used to tailor product placement to specific demographics or markets, and in some cases, add placements to works that did not originally have embedded advertising, or update existing placements.

== History ==
=== Origins ===
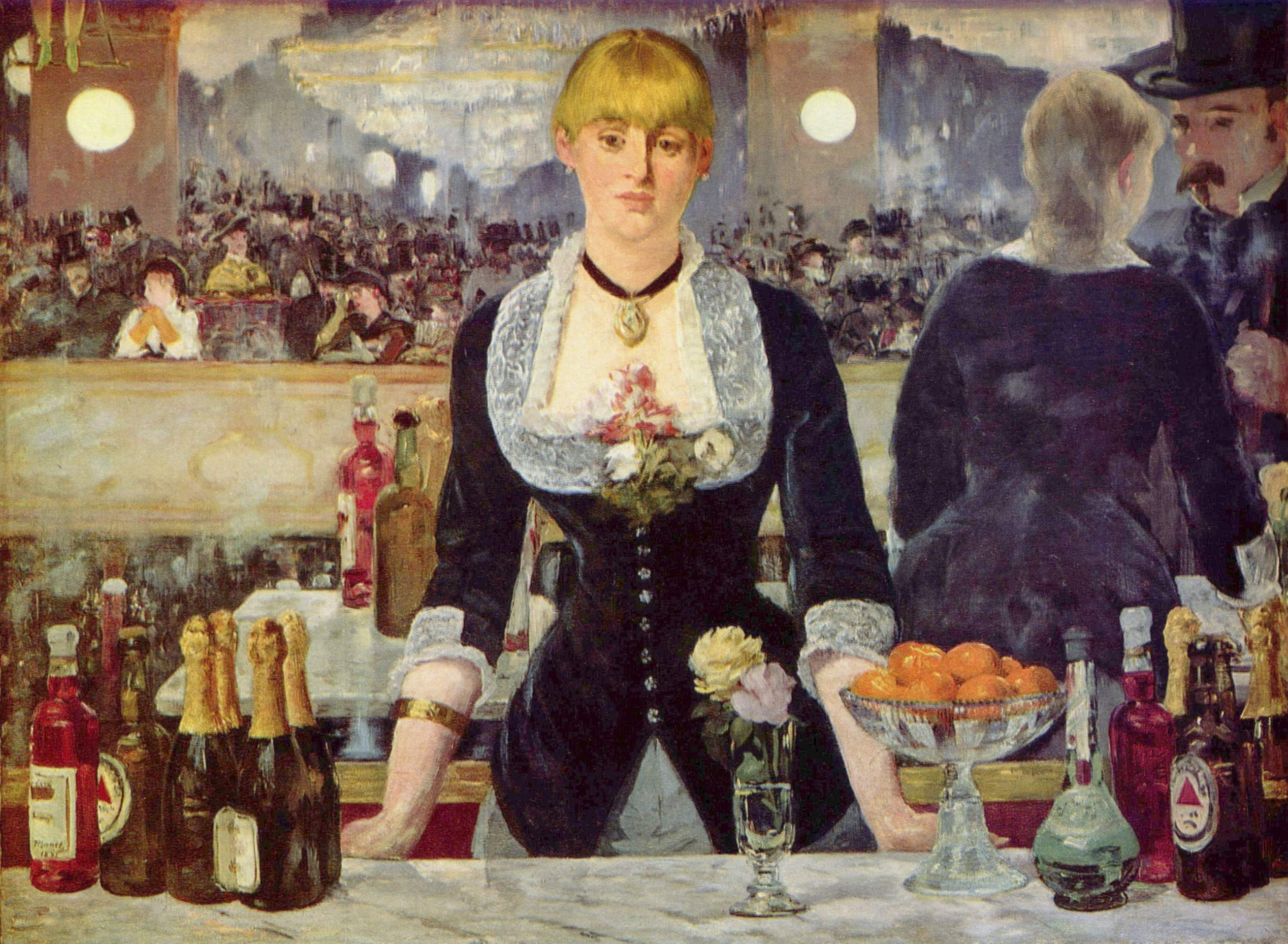
A Bar at the Folies-Bergère by Édouard Manet may be an early example of product placement. The distinctive label and shape of two bottles allow them to be identified as Bass beer.

Product placement began in the 19th century. By the time Jules Verne published the adventure novel Around the World in Eighty Days (1873), his fame had led transport and shipping companies to lobby to be mentioned in the story. Whether Verne was actually paid to do so remains unknown. Similarly, a painting by Édouard Manet (1881–1882) shows a bar at the Folies Bergère with distinctive bottles placed at either end of the counter. The beer bottle is immediately recognisable as Bass beer. Manet's motivations for including branded products in his painting are unknown; it may be that it simply added to the work's authenticity, but on the other hand the artist may have received some payment in return for its inclusion.

Research reported by Jean-Marc Lehu (2007) suggests that films produced by Auguste and Louis Lumière in 1896 were made at the request of a representative of Lever Brothers in France. The films feature Sunlight soap, which may be the first recorded instance of paid product placement in film. This led to cinema becoming one of the earliest channels used for product placement.

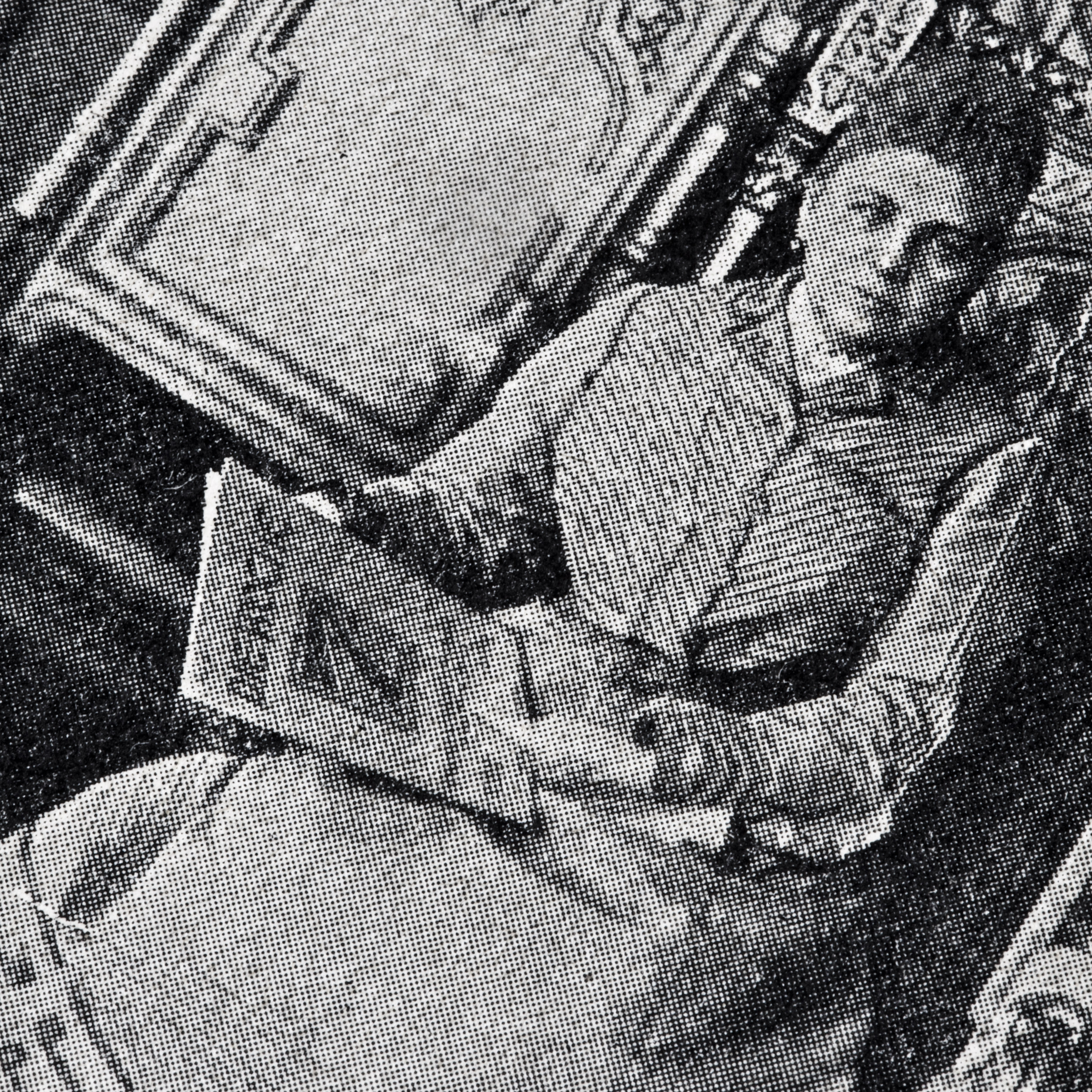
Self-advertising: A German countess holds a copy of the magazine Die Woche in her hands. The photo appeared in 1902 in an issue of the magazine. (Detail of the actual photograph).

With the arrival of photo-rich periodicals in the late 19th century, publishers found ways of lifting their paper's reputation by placing an issue of the magazine in photographs of prominent people. For example, the German magazine Die Woche in 1902 printed an article about a countess in her castle where she, in one of the photographs, holds a copy of the magazine in her hands.

Product placement was a common feature of many of the earliest actualities and cinematic attractions from the first ten years of cinema history.

During the next four decades, the motion picture trade journal Harrison's Reports frequently cited cases of on-screen brand-name placement. Harrison condemned the practice as harmful to movie theatres, and his editorials reflected his hostility towards product placement in films. Harrison's Reports published its first denunciation of that practice over Red Crown gasoline's appearance in The Garage (1920). Another editorial criticised the collaboration between the Corona Typewriter company and First National Pictures when a Corona typewriter appeared in several films in the mid-1920s including The Lost World (1925).

Recognisable brand names appeared in movies from cinema's earliest history. Before films had narrative form in the current sense, industrial concerns financed the making of what film scholar Tom Gunning described as "cinematic attractions", short films of one or two minutes. In the first decade or so of film (1895–1907) audiences attended films as "fairground attractions" interesting for their then-amazing visual effects. This format was better suited to product placement than narrative cinema. Leon Gurevitch argued that early cinematic attractions have more in common with television advertisements in the 1950s than they do with traditional films. Gurevitch suggested that as a result, the relationship between cinema and advertising is intertwined, suggesting that cinema was in part the result of advertising and the economic benefits that it provided early filmmakers. Segrave detailed the industries that were advertised in these early films.

=== Movies and television ===
==== Early film ====
A feature film that has expectations of reaching millions of viewers attracts marketers. In many cases the film producers request no payment for product exposure when consumer brands appear in movies. Film productions need props for scenes, so each movie's property master, who is responsible for gathering props for the film, contacts advertising agencies or product companies directly. In addition to items for on-screen use, the product or service supplier might provide a production with complimentary products or services. Tapping product placement channels can be particularly valuable for movies when a vintage product is required—such as a sign or bottle—that is not readily available.

Although there is no definitive proof that product placement for Red Crown gasoline in The Garage, Fritz Lang's Dr. Mabuse the Gambler (1922) contained a prominent title card in the opening credits reading "The gowns of the female stars were designed by Vally Reinecke and made in the fashion studios of Flatow-Schädler und Mossner." Among silent films to feature product placement was Wings (1927), the first to win the Academy Award for Best Picture. It contained a plug for Hershey's chocolate. Fritz Lang's film Woman in the Moon (1929) shows someone drinking prominently from a glass for Odol, a popular German brand of mouthwash, and his film M (1931) shows a banner display for Wrigley's PK Chewing Gum, for approximately 20–30 seconds. The Edison Company collaborated with The Ladies' World, a mail-order journal, to create serials using formulaic storytelling which included products sold in the journal. This tactic began a trend of serials with products marketed towards women through the silent film era.

Another early example occurs in Horse Feathers (1932), where Thelma Todd's character falls out of a canoe and into a river. She calls for a "life saver" and Groucho Marx tosses her a Life Savers candy. It's a Wonderful Life (1946) depicts a young boy with aspirations to be an explorer, displaying a prominent copy of National Geographic magazine. In Love Happy (1949), Harpo cavorts on a rooftop among various billboards and at one point escapes from the villains on the old Mobil logo, the "Flying Red Horse". Harrison's Reports severely criticised this scene in its film review and in a front-page editorial. In Gun Crazy (1949), the climactic crime is the payroll robbery of the Armour meat-packing plant, where a Bulova clock is prominently displayed. In the 1958 British WWII movie Ice Cold in Alex, the long sought after ice cold beer in question turns out to be (clearly) a Carlsberg.

==== Later films ====
The James Bond film You Only Live Twice (1967) featured the Toyota 2000GT, and the films Smokey and the Bandit (1977) and The Cannonball Run (1981) film series featured conspicuous placements. The science fiction film E.T. the Extra-Terrestrial (1982) is often cited for its multiple, obvious placements, including the candy Reese's Pieces, into the plot. In the New World Pictures dub of The Return of Godzilla, Godzilla 1985, Dr Pepper was prominently placed in the new scenes shot for the dub. In a scene shot at an American military base, a vending machine is directly between two characters, and in similar scenes characters are often depicted drinking the soft drink.

Cheerios and Coca-Cola were placed in the Andrew Lloyd Webber musical Evita, in Superman: The Movie, and in its sequel Superman II. Clark Kent eats Cheerios for breakfast in Smallville. In Superman II's climax, Superman crashes into a giant Coca-Cola advertisement and saves people on a bus bearing an ad for Evita, before he smashes into a Marlboro delivery truck.

In the 1993 film Demolition Man, the fast food chain Taco Bell is integrated directly into the film's lore, depicting it as the only remaining restaurant franchise in existence by 2032. Since Taco Bell was not well known outside of the U.S., for the international release of the film it was replaced with Pizza Hut, another restaurant chain owned by Yum! Brands. Lines were re-dubbed and logos changed during post-production.

In the film Cast Away, Tom Hanks, the lead character, is a FedEx employee. A volleyball from Wilson Sporting Goods is also prominently featured in the film. References to the delivery company FedEx are made throughout the film, and the company is central to the plot. The Internship (2013), which features two unemployed slacker friends seeking employment at Google, was described by Tom Brook of the BBC as "one huge advertisement for Google" that took "product placement to a startling new extreme". Rolling Stone magazine included it on a list of the 10 Egregious Product Placements in film.

==== Early radio and television ====
Over-the-air (OTA) radio and television in the United States are not funded through end user license or subscription. In US radio since the 1930s and television since the 1950s, programs have been normally underwritten by sponsors. Soap operas were named for the consumer packaged goods products advertised by Procter & Gamble and Unilever. When television began to grow popular, DuMont's 1950s Cavalcade of Stars show did not rely on a sole sponsor. Sponsorship continues with programs sponsored by major vendors such as Hallmark Cards.

The expansion of television ownership in the 1950s saw an increase in the viability of product placement in the eyes of marketing executives. Various marketing studies analyzed consumer habits related to the time of programming leading to competition between brands in securing their products in network shows at optimal times. This same practice was used in targeting specific demographics with the products being used such as Studebaker cars being used in shows during prime adult viewing hours. The conspicuous display of Studebaker motor vehicles in the television series Mister Ed (1961–1966), which was sponsored by the Studebaker Corporation from 1961 to 1963, as well as the display of Ford vehicles on the series Hazel (1961–1966), which was sponsored by the Ford Motor Company from 1961 to 1965, are prominent examples of television product placement.

The UK commercial television network ITV broadcast admags—entertainment programs with product placement—such as Jim's Inn until Parliament banned them in 1963.

==== Later television ====
The expansion of the reality television genre in the 1990s provided an avenue for products to be demonstrated in a more natural manner. Product integration into programs such as MTV's The Real World became easier as they did not need to be written into the plot; rather, they are just present in the lives of the people on the show.

As June Deery describes in her 2012 book Consuming Reality: The Commercialization of Factual Entertainment, the home makeover genre could provide a similar experience for the viewer as an Infomercial as real products and companies produced a desirable outcome. A prominent example of product placement in these shows is in the series Fixer Upper in which Joanna Gaines and Chip Gaines used their real company Magnolia Market in the show.

== Types ==
Placements fall into two main categories: paid and unpaid. Most product placements are unpaid. In unpaid product placements, the advertiser will usually loan or give the product to the production. The productions costs are reduced, as they would otherwise have to buy or rent the items.

Subcategories are basic, when a logo is merely visible, and advanced, whereby the product or brand is spoken by characters in the show or movie. Barter and service deals (the branded product is provided for crew use, for instance) are common. Content providers may trade product placements for help funding advertisements tied-in with a film's release, a show's new season or other event. Still another variant, known as an advertisement placement, displays an advertisement for the product (rather than the product itself) which appears in the production, such as an advertisement on a billboard or a bus that appears in the show.

=== Brand integration ===
Brand integration, a variant of product placement, is when "the product or company name becomes part of the show in such a way that it contributes to the narrative and creates an environment of brand awareness beyond that produced by advanced placement." While this type of advertising is common on unscripted shows such as The Apprentice, it can also be used in scripted television. An early example was by Abercrombie & Fitch, when one of its stores provided the notional venue for part of the romantic comedy film Man's Favorite Sport? (1964). On All My Children one character took a job at Revlon. The character's job became part of the character's development.

Jurassic Park not only prominently features Ford cars and other commercial products, but also includes a scene displaying its own promotional merchandise. One shot shows the "Jurassic Park Souvenir Store", with products that it offered for sale to fans.

=== Product displacement ===
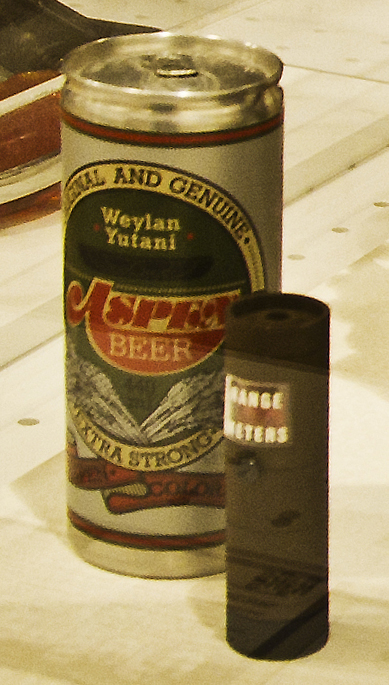
Aspen beer, a fictional brand from the 1979 film Alien

A real brand logo may be hidden or replaced with fictional brand names in a production, either to imitate, satirize or differentiate the product from a real corporate brand. Such a device may be required where real corporations are unwilling to license their brand names for use in the fictional work, particularly where the work holds the product in a negative light.

According to Danny Boyle, director of the film Slumdog Millionaire (2008), the makers used "product displacement" to accommodate sponsors such as Mercedes-Benz that refused to allow their products to be used in non-flattering settings. While Mercedes did not mind having a gangster driving their cars, they objected to their products being shown in a slum. The makers removed logos digitally in post-production, costing "tens of thousands of pounds". When such issues are brought up in advance of filming, production companies often resort to "greeking", the practice of simply covering logos with tape, but one of them driven by Latika is shown to have the logos on the car keys.

Similarly, in The Blues Brothers (1980), portions of the defunct Dixie Square Mall in Harvey, Illinois, were reconstructed in façade and used as the scene of an indoor car chase. Signage belonging to mall tenants was replaced with that of other vendors; for instance, a Walgreens would become a Toys "R" Us.

Cars (2006) parodies NASCAR, an advertising-heavy sport which controversially had long allowed alcohol and tobacco sponsorships. NASCAR's sponsors were replaced with fictional or parody brands; Dinoco Oil takes pride of place, followed by a string of invented automotive aftermarket products marketed in a similar means to pharmaceutical products. "Dale Earnhardt Inc." displaced "Junior #8"'s sponsor Budweiser to avoid advertising beer in a Disney & Pixar feature. The racing series portrayed in the film is also known as the "Piston Cup", as a pun on the NASCAR Cup Series' past sponsor of Winston cigarettes (during which time it was known as the "Winston Cup Series"; it has since been succeeded by phone carrier Sprint and energy drink Monster Energy).

=== Audio vs visual ===
Placements can be sound-only, visual-only or a combination of both. The Russian television show дом-2 (phonetically Dom-2) (similar to Big Brother) often features participants stating something along the lines of, "Oh, did you check out the new product X by company Y yet?" after which the camera zooms in on the named product, explicitly combining an audio mention with a visual image. In The Real World/Road Rules Challenge participants often make a similar comment, usually pertaining to the mobile device and carrier for a text message.

An experiment from 2002 tested the relationship between auditory vs visual product placement and if the product had higher or lower connection to the plot to how well it was remembered by viewers. The results of the experiment concluded that regardless of if the product had higher or lower connection to the plot, in either circumstance an auditory product placement was more likely to be remembered by viewers than a visual product placement.

=== Branded content ===
Branded content refers to works that are funded or produced by an advertiser as a vehicle for their brand. Some forms of branded content do include self-placed product placement (such as a series of made-for-TV movies produced by Walmart and Procter & Gamble, which featured placements for P&G products and Walmart store brands), but some (such as, most prominently, the media operations of energy drink brand Red Bull) are focused more upon producing content that appeal to their product's demographics and image, rather than being a promotion for their products first and foremost.

=== Cross-promotion ===
Larger, vertically integrated conglomerates may include placements of their own products and services in works as a form of corporate synergy. Owing to its common ownership, Sony Pictures films have featured placements of Sony's consumer electronics products, particularly Xperia smartphones. The James Bond films Skyfall and Spectre depict Bond using Sony Xperia T and Z5 smartphones respectively, and the Xperia T was bundled with James Bond-themed content (including ringtones, wallpapers, and behind the scenes photos from the filming of Skyfall) as a tie-in in some markets. Similarly, some 20th Century Fox films depicted the then co-owned Fox News Channel as a source of in-universe news programming.

=== Replacement ===
Product placements can also be added or replaced during post-production. For example, placements can be added to scenes that did not already have them when originally filmed, and placements can also be modified in future airings or prints of a film or television series.

=== Parodies ===
The pilot episode of the NBC sitcom 30 Rock featured the General Electric (at the time an 80% owner of NBC) Trivection oven, but was said to be a joke by the show's creator. The show later parodied placement.

The 1988 film Return of the Killer Tomatoes mocked the concept when at one point the film stops for lack of money. The character played by George Clooney suggests product placement as a way to continue. This was followed by several scenes with blatant product placement, including a Pepsi billboard installed in front of the villain's mansion.

The 1994 film The Making of '...And God Spoke' is a mockumentary about the filming of a biblical epic. When running low on funds to complete the film within a film, the desperate producers resort to product placement, resulting in the absurd anachronism of Moses descending from Mount Sinai carrying the Ten Commandments and a six-pack of Coca-Cola.

The film Fight Club, directed by David Fincher, bit the hand that fed it by depicting acts of violence against most of the products that paid to be placed in the film. Examples include the scene where the Apple Store is broken into, the scene where Brad Pitt and Edward Norton smash the headlights of a new Volkswagen Beetle, and try to blow up a "popular coffee franchise", a thinly veiled dig at Starbucks.

The film Superstar, starring Will Ferrell and Molly Shannon, shows every resident in town driving Volkswagen New Beetles, possibly for comic effect. Similarly, the film Mr. Deeds shows Adam Sandler's character purchasing a Chevrolet Corvette for every resident of his town.

The 2006 Will Ferrell comedy film Talladega Nights: The Ballad of Ricky Bobby parodied the large amount of sponsorship in NASCAR, having the title character at one point driving with an obstructive decal of the Fig Newtons logo on his car's windshield, and including a plug for Powerade into a saying of grace before dinner.

Wayne's World featured a scene where Wayne refuses to allow his show's sponsor to appear on the air. When told it is part of his contract, Wayne argues that the deal "didn't include selling out" while conspicuously drinking a can of Pepsi, eating Doritos, and displaying a Pizza Hut pizza. Garth then laments that "people only do things because they get paid" while his entire wardrobe consists of Reebok athletic wear. Finally, Wayne complains of a headache and Garth advises him to take Nuprin while cutting to a few seconds of a Nuprin TV ad.

Kung Pow! Enter the Fist spoofed its product placements, highlighting the anachronistic inclusion of a Taco Bell. In a similar vein, in Looney Tunes: Back In Action, the main characters stumble across a Wal-Mart while stranded in the middle of Death Valley and acquire supplies just for providing an endorsement. Kannagi: Crazy Shrine Maidens poked fun at its sponsor Sony by having one character give another a Blu-ray Disc with the tagline "It's a Sony", only for them to complain that they do not have a Blu-ray player, to which the character responds with a version in Betamax.

=== Faux placements ===
Some films do not wish to depict real brands onscreen, so fake brands are created for products shown onscreen.

X-Files (1993–2002) (as well as many other films and television productions) featured the fictional Morley brand of cigarettes, the choice of the Cigarette Smoking Man. The company producing Morleys was also involved in a cover-up conspiracy, Brand X.

Ghostbusters featured an in-universe brand of marshmallows, Stay Puft; the brand plays a role in the film's climax, when the apocalyptic deity Gozer manifests itself as an anthropomorphic version of the company's mascot—a composite inspired by similarly-designed characters such as the Pillsbury Doughboy and Michelin Man.

The Mel Brooks film Spaceballs—a spoof of Star Wars—satirized product placement and merchandising (and, in particular, a request by Star Wars creator George Lucas that action figures not be produced to promote the film) by featuring a running gag of Spaceballs-branded products existing in-universe; one scene featured the character Yogurt hawking merchandise for Spaceballs itself (declaring it to be "where the real money from the movie is made") at a gift shop in his temple, ranging from innocuous items such as shirts, lunchboxes, and breakfast cereal, to a Spaceballs flamethrower that is apparently marketed towards children. Other scenes in the film featured parody brands such as "Perri-Air", a brand of canned oxygen satirizing the bottled water brand Perrier.

The Truman Show used fake placements to advance the narrative of the reality television set. Truman's wife places products in front of hidden cameras, even naming them in dialogue with her husband. This increases Truman's suspicions as he comes to realize his surroundings are intentionally fabricated.

Some filmmakers created fictional products that appear in multiple movies. Examples include Kevin Smith (Nails Cigarettes, Mooby Corporation, Chewlees Gum, Discreeto Burritos) and Quentin Tarantino (Red Apple Cigarettes, Jack Rabbit Slim's Restaurants, Big Kahuna Burger). This went even further with the fictional brand Binford Tools which appeared in TV shows Home Improvement and Last Man Standing and in the Toy Story movie franchise, all starring Tim Allen.

This practice is also fairly common in certain comics, such as Svetlana Chmakova's Dramacon, which makes several product-placement-esque usages of "Pawky", (a modification of the name of the Japanese snack "Pocky", popular among anime and manga fans) or Naoko Takeuchi's Sailor Moon, which includes numerous references to the series Codename: Sailor V, from which Sailor Moon was spun off.

This practice is also common in certain "reality-based" video games such as the Grand Theft Auto series, which feature fictitious stores such as Ammu-Nation, Vinyl Countdown, Gash (spoofing Gap) Zip, Pizza Boy, etc.

=== Reverse placement ===
So-called "reverse product placement" creates real products to match those seen in a fictional setting, typically as a tie-in.

Willy Wonka & the Chocolate Factory (1971) led to a real Willy Wonka candy company, established soon after the film's release.

In 1949, Crazy Eddie was created as a fictional car dealer in the film A Letter to Three Wives. That name, bestowed in 1971 upon a real-life electronics chain in New York City, appeared in 1984 in an ad in Splash. Crazy Eddie's memorable ads are parodied in Howard the Duck, featuring a duck version of the famous pitchman, and UHF, as "Crazy Ernie", a used car salesman, threatens to club a baby seal if nobody comes in to buy a car.

In 2007, as a promotional tie-in for The Simpsons Movie, 7-Eleven temporarily turned twelve of its locations into Kwik-E-Marts—a fictional chain of convenience stores within the universe of The Simpsons. The stores sold real-world versions of food and drink brands seen in the franchise, including Buzz Cola, Duff Beer and Krusty-O's.

=== Music and recording industries ===
While radio and television stations are regulated by national governments, producers of printed or recorded works are not, leading marketers to attempt to get products mentioned in lyrics of popular songs.

In 2008, The Kluger Agency was claimed to have proposed placement of Double Happiness Jeans, a virtual sweatshop created as part of the Invisible Threads project for the 2008 Sundance Festival, in a Pussycat Dolls song for a fee. The firm was not intended to represent a commercial product. It had been invented as a collaboration between Jeff Crouse of the Anti-Advertising Agency and Stephanie Rothenberg. While the product technically existed at the time, Double Happiness was intended to be a critical piece.

In January 2009, Migra Corridos, a five-song EP including accordion ballad "El Mas Grande Enemigo", had received airplay on twenty-five Mexican radio stations. The tune purports to be the lament of a would-be immigrant left to die in the Arizona desert by coyotes (people smugglers). No disclosure was made to the radio stations that the U.S. Border Patrol had commissioned the project with content devised by Elevación, a Hispanic advertising agency based in Washington, D.C., and New York City.

In 2010, a video for Lady Gaga's "Telephone" was criticised by some for displaying nine brands in nine minutes (including her own line of Heartbeats headphones), many as paid product placements. Other 2010 music videos displayed the PlentyofFish website include Natasha Bedingfield's "Touch", Flo Rida and Akon's "Available", Jason Derulo's "Ridin' Solo", and 3OH!3's "Double Vision".

In 2011, Britney Spears's music video for "Hold It Against Me" advertised PlentyofFish and Sony; one Washington Post review denounced the video as an informercial.

Jennifer Lopez's Fiat-sponsored music video "Papi" was edited for broadcast as a 30-second advertisement for the Fiat 500 Cabrio in 2011. The original video also advertised BlackBerry, Tous, Planet Love Match and Crown Royal.

Alcohol advertising in music videos drew criticism from Curtin University in Perth, Australia in 2011. An Alcohol Beverages Advertising Code (ABAC) exists in Australia to handle complaints, but a placement of Midori liqueur in Cobra Starship's "You Make Me Feel..." was judged not to be alcohol advertising.

Rap and hip-hop are notorious for the high level of product placement in lyrics and music videos; as rappers flaunt luxury brands to show off their wealthy lifestyle, companies pay to have their products named in tracks. This integration began in 1986 with Run-DMC's "My Adidas." Hennessy and Alizé are notable as alcoholic drinks which became popular after being promoted in rap.

=== Comics ===
The South African football comic book Supa Strikas accepts product placement to allow for the comic's free distribution. Product placement occurs throughout the publication; on players' shirts, billboards and signage, and through the branding of locations or scenarios. Supa Strikas receives the majority of its support from Chevron, via its Caltex and Texaco brands.

In markets where Chevron lacks a presence, other brands step in, e.g., including Visa in Kenya, Uganda and Tanzania. Other brands include their logos included as both billboard and background advertising, and through the branding of locations and scenarios. These companies include Metropolitan Life, Nike, Spur Steak Ranches and the South African National Roads Agency, among others.

Other titles adopted the same business model, including the cricket comic Supa Tigers and Strike Zone.

=== Literature ===
In 2001, British author Fay Weldon published The Bulgari Connection, a novel commissioned by Italian jewellery company Bulgari. According to The Independent, this was the first instance of a literary product-placement deal between an established writer of fiction and a commercial partner. A 2016 series of experiments done at Texas A&M University found that products integrated into a text format led to a higher intention to buy that product.

== Sports ==
Product placement has long been prevalent in sports at all levels.

=== NFL ===
While now-defunct NFL Europe allowed liberal use of team uniforms by sponsors, the main National Football League (NFL) does not. In the United States, the league prohibits logos of sponsors painted onto the fields, although Gillette Stadium in Foxborough, Massachusetts, has their stadium's logomark painted onto the FieldTurf field. In 2008, the league allowed sponsors on the practice jerseys of the uniforms, but not game uniforms.

In 1991, the league allowed uniform suppliers to display their logos on their NFL-related products. Since 2012, Nike has been the league's official uniform supplier.

Early on, two of the league's flagship teams—the Green Bay Packers and the Pittsburgh Steelers—adopted their identity from corporate sponsors. The Packers adopted the name "Packers" because they were sponsored by the Indian Packing Company. They later had "ACME PACKERS" written on their uniforms in the early 1920s after the Acme Packing Company bought Indian Packing. The Steelers adopted their current logo in 1962 as a product-placement deal with the American Iron and Steel Institute, which owned the rights to the Steelmark logo. The Steelers later were allowed to add "-ers" to the Steelmark logo the following year so that they could own a trademark on the logo. (The Steelers' pre-NFL predecessors also regularly sold naming rights to companies in the Pittsburgh area.)

NFL Japan was a sponsor of the football-themed anime series Eyeshield 21.

=== Auto racing ===
In auto racing, the concept of the factory-backed contestant, who is provided with vehicles and technical support in return for the car's manufacturer obtaining visibility for its products in competition, dates in NASCAR to the 1950s and Marshall Teague's factory-backed Fabulous Hudson Hornet. "Win on Sunday, sell on Monday" was once a common adage among automakers.

In Formula One, a number of major racing teams were once sponsored by tobacco companies, including Marlboro (which has had tenures with Ferrari and the McLaren team). Due to tightening regulations on tobacco advertising worldwide, many of these sponsorships have either been dropped, or downplayed and replaced with subliminal versions on vehicle livery when races are held in regions with heavy restrictions or outright bans on the marketing of cigarettes (such as the European Union). In the present day, similar issues are faced by Stake, an online casino that sponsors the Sauber Motorsport team; Kick—a video game livestreaming platform backed by Stake's co-founders—serves as a team co-sponsor, and an alternate Kick-themed livery is primarily used for races in regions where Stake cannot be advertised.

== Video games ==
The 2008 book Changing the Game: How Video Games are Transforming the Future of Business by David Edery and Ethan Mollick describes two forms of product placement in video games, highly interactive and peripheral. Highly interactive product placement consists of products being integral to the plot of the game and progression in the game requiring the use of the product. Peripheral product placement consists of objects such as billboards or clothing which are passively viewed.

As described in a 2006 article in the Journal of Advertising, the interactive nature of video games leads to a stronger implicit association with brand names. The effectiveness of In-game advertising is also explored in a 2004 research article in the Journal of Interactive Advertising where the direct interaction with the brand creates a different method of processing advertisements.

Examples of in game product placements include in EA's Battlefield 2142, ads for Intel Core 2 processors appear on map billboards, EA's The Sims contained downloadable in-game advertising for Intel and for McDonald's, Rare's Perfect Dark Zero features ads for Samsung in their menus. Celebrity endorsements are also common in video games as with Tiger Woods in CyberTiger.

== Notable placements ==
Automobiles, apparel, beverages, home goods, furniture, consumer electronics, computers, restaurants, financial institutions, travel, airlines and websites are just a few of the product categories.

FedEx provided vehicles, access, and logistical support for the making of Cast Away. The movie depicted real FedEx locations, and the company's then CEO Frederick W. Smith appears in one scene.

=== Automobiles ===
The most common products to be promoted in this way are automobiles. Frequently, all the important vehicles in a film or television series are supplied by one manufacturer.

The James Bond film franchise has been well known for featuring product placements for various vehicles, particularly luxury and sports cars. Aston Martin has been the most synonymous with the franchise, dating back to the appearance of the Aston Martin DB5 as Bond's vehicle in Goldfinger (1964).

Cars (2006) portrays a mix of real and fictional vehicles as characters. None are directly paid product placements, but many are factory-backed by manufacturers who provided technical assistance and vehicles during production. The Lexus LC 500 was featured in the 2018 film Black Panther. The Audi R8 was featured in the Iron Man film series, while the Acura NSX Roadster was featured in The Avengers.

=== Apparel and accessories ===
The James Bond series has also featured associations with various accessory and fashion brands, such as Rolex and Omega watches, Calvin Klein clothing, and Samsonite luggage.

Vera Wang, Carolina Herrera, Christian Lacroix, Lanvin, Dior, Oscar De La Renta, Manolo Blahnik and Vivienne Westwood were all featured in the TV series Sex and the City. Under Armour has been featured in films such as the Fast and the Furious The Martian, 22 Jump Street, and Fantastic Four.

=== Consumer electronics and computers ===
Apple's products frequently appear in films, music videos and on television. Apple has stated that they do not pay for this, but declined to discuss how its products are placed; some Apple placements have stemmed from their products' ubiquity and position as a status symbol, rather than actual paid promotion. For example, Pixar films have often included references to Apple products as an homage to company co-founder Steve Jobs, who was an early investor in the studio. Apple products are also prominently displayed in shows produced for their streaming service Apple TV+. The Wall Street Journal reported that, in a sample of 74 Apple TV+ episodes, over 700 instances of Apple product placement were shown, either on set or actively being used by characters.

The use of a Samsung smartphone in the Oscar Selfie was noted as an example of successful product placement. The selfie was valued at an estimated $800 million to $1 billion by Publicis, which manages Samsung's international advertising.

The 2010 Modern Family episode "Game Changer" prominently featured the iPad and aired prior to its launch, while the 2015 episode "Connection Lost" was presented entirely from the perspective of a MacBook owned by main character Claire Dunphy, who interacted with other characters via FaceTime video calls and iMessage, and used other macOS applications. Show creator Steven Levitan said the show had an ongoing relationship with Apple, but did not elaborate further. In the case of the former, while the episode's credits did state that the iPad was "provided" by Apple, the company did not pay the show's broadcaster ABC for the integration, nor buy any commercial time during the episode. Similarly, Apple did not provide any financial compensation for "Connection Lost", but did provide MacBook Pro and iPhone hardware for the filming, and a Mac Pro workstation for post-production.

=== Food and beverage ===
The use of Reese's Pieces as a prominent plot element in the film E.T. the Extra-Terrestrial was the result of a sponsorship deal; it was originally intended for the titular character's favorite food to be M&M's candies, but Mars Incorporated turned down an offer, believing the film's alien would scare children. The Hershey Company took the sponsorship instead, which included the rights for the company to cross-promote Reese's Pieces with the film. The deal was considered a major coup for the company; sales of Reese's Pieces tripled, and some retailers had trouble meeting demand for the product.

Alongside criticism for trying to ride off the popularity of E.T., the film Mac and Me was widely criticized for containing numerous placements for Coca-Cola soft drinks and the fast food chain McDonald's; both brands are integral to the film's plot, while McDonald's mascot Ronald McDonald makes an appearance during a dance scene set at a McDonald's, and is credited as appearing in the film "as himself". Critics also noted that the name of the alien creature featured in the film, "Mac", could also be interpreted as a reference to the chain's notable burger, the Big Mac. Its producer R.J. Louis denied that the film was funded by McDonald's; he had previously worked on campaigns for the company and wanted to make a film that would help benefit the Ronald McDonald House Charities, and had to pursue rights to portray the McDonald's brand in the film (noting that he was "still the only person in the universe that ever had the exclusive motion picture rights to the McDonald's trademark, their actors, their characters, and the whole company"), but did receive funding from one of the chain's major suppliers, Golden State Foods. He also justified the extended dance scene, as trips to McDonald's were often seen as a "treat" for children of the era, and explained that "Mac" was meant to be an acronym for "Mysterious Alien Creature".

The James Bond series has also prominently featured placements for liquor, tied to the character's recurring affinity for martinis (particularly, vespers), although Skyfall deviated from this tradition by entering into a promotional deal with Dutch brewery Heineken (which also allowed the company to feature Bond actor Daniel Craig in an accompanying ad campaign).

=== Tobacco ===
Tobacco companies have made direct payment to stars for using their cigarettes in films. Sylvester Stallone received US$500,000 to use Brown and Williamson tobacco products in five feature films.

In response to a Christian Science Monitor article accusing the industry of deliberately using product placement as an advertising strategy, the Tobacco Institute claimed that product placement is driven by filmmakers to "achieve desired artistic effects but also to offset production costs". It also claimed "the 1970 federal ban on cigarette advertising on television and radio does not prohibit payments to filmmakers for the use of cigarettes in a film." The rebuttal concludes with the sentiment that smoking in film provides a certain "aesthetic" which is legitimate and at the filmmaker's discretion.

=== Airlines ===
Many airlines have advertised prominently in film, in some cases to promote a new flight route or just to increase public awareness of the company. Pan Am advertised in many films, including 2001: A Space Odyssey and James Bond films. American Airlines was advertised in Home Alone and Home Alone 2, and a model of a Virgin Atlantic Boeing 747 was shown in Wayne's World. Mike Myers' later film, Austin Powers: The Spy Who Shagged Me, featured a major promotion with Virgin, including repainting some of Virgin's fleet to read "Virgin Shaglantic".

American Airlines and Hilton Hotels were featured in the film Up in the Air.

Turkish Airlines was featured in the film Batman v Superman: Dawn of Justice. Warner Bros and Turkish Airlines signed a contract together to help promote and endorse the film.

== Legal considerations ==
=== United States ===
Much of U.S. broadcast law pertaining to on-air product promotion dates to the payola scandals of 1950s broadcast radio. An investigation launched in November 1959 into allegations that some radio disc jockeys had accepted bribes in return for radio airplay ended with a US$2,500 fine for disc jockey Alan Freed (of WABC and WINS) for violating commercial bribery laws. On September 13, 1960, the U.S. government banned payola in broadcasting. Under 47 U.S.C. § 317 "All matter broadcast by any radio station for which money, service, or other valuable consideration is directly or indirectly paid, or promised to or charged or accepted by, the station so broadcasting, from any person, shall, at the time the same is so broadcast, be announced as paid for or furnished, as the case may be, by such person..." with similar and related provisions reflected in Federal Communications Commission regulations as 47 CFR 73.1212.

These provisions have governed subsequent payola investigations, including a 2005 investigation into Sony BMG and other major record companies.

Often, a broadcaster claimed to have complied by placing an acknowledgement in an inconspicuous place, such as embedded within the credits. In 2005 U.S. Federal Communications Commission commissioner Jonathan Adelstein stated "if broadcasters and cable TV companies insist on further commercializing new and other shows alike, that is their business. But if they do so without disclosing it to the viewing public, that is payola, and that is the FCC's business."

A TV or film studio does not need permission from a company to display or mention its products or service in media form. For example, Warner Bros. Television's The Big Bang Theory uses a restaurant of The Cheesecake Factory as a setting without any formal arrangement with the chain. As no money is exchanged, there is no need to mention "promotional considerations".

=== United Kingdom ===
The 'PP' icon, introduced by Ofcom to identify programs on television which contain product placement

In the United Kingdom, placement by commercial broadcasters was forbidden prior to 2011. On February 28, 2011, telecommunications regulator Ofcom legalised placements in certain types of programming. A placement must be "editorially justified" and not place "undue prominence" on the product. Product placements are not allowed for products that cannot legally be advertised on television, including alcohol, baby milk, gambling, medication, or junk food. Placements are not allowed during children's, news, public affairs and religious programmes. Additionally, broadcasters must disclose placements on-air by displaying a "PP" icon for at least three seconds at the beginning of the programme, after each commercial break, and at the end of the programme. The first legal product placement on British television came during an episode of This Morning, for a Nestlé-produced coffee maker. As with all other forms of commercial advertising, the BBC is barred from furnishing product placements in its programming. One notable example was the 1970 song "Lola" by The Kinks, which originally referred to "Coca-Cola" but was quickly changed to the generic "cherry cola" in order to be played on BBC radio.

== Extreme examples ==
Back to the Future Part II included production placement for futuristic versions of Nike footwear, Pepsi-Cola and USA Today.

Blade Runner included prominent placement for many brands. The logos of Atari, Bell, Coca-Cola, Cuisinart and Pan Am, all market leaders at the time, were prominently displayed.

I, Robot offers placements for Converse, Ovaltine, Audi, FedEx, Dos Equis and JVC among others, all of them introduced within the film's first ten minutes. One moment includes a straightforward advertisement where Will Smith's character responds to a compliment about his shoes, to which he replies "Converse All-Stars, vintage 2004" (the year of the film's release). Audi created a special car for the film, the Audi RSQ. Surveys conducted in the US showed that the placements boosted the brand's image. The Audi RSQ appears for nine minutes, and other Audis also appear in the film. I, Robot was ranked "the worst film for product placement" on a British site.

In December 2003, a series of commercials were commissioned for Cristal beer, which were broadcast at the beginning of each advertising break during the broadcast of Star Wars on Canal 13, such that the spots appeared to be continuations of the preceding scenes. The campaign, titled The Force is with Cristal Beer, won awards at various international events, including at Cannes Lions.

The Island features at least 35 individual products or brands, including cars, bottled water, shoes, credit cards, beer, ice cream, and a web search engine. In the movie's DVD Commentary track, director Michael Bay claims he added the advertisements for greater realism.

Josie and the Pussycats contains placements in most of the shots. This appears to be done ironically, as the plot of the film revolves around subliminal messages in advertising. The film's general message can also be construed as an anti-consumerist one. The film neither sought nor received compensation for the placements.

The 2009 Star Trek, in a scene where young James Kirk drives and crashes a Chevrolet Corvette, he operates a Nokia touch-screen smartphone. Before running the car off the cliff while being chased by a hovering motorcycle cop, the distinct Nokia trademark ring tone can be heard. The Finnish phone maker offered Star Trek apps for its phones. The use of contemporary products was ridiculed, as the scene is set in the year 2255.

"The Package", a 2012 episode of Hawaii Five-0, was heavily criticised and mocked for a 50-second sequence in which a character praised Subway sandwiches and promoted the Subway diet.

The 2013 Filipino film My Little Bossings attracted criticism for its extensive use of product placement. Reviewers panned the film for being "one long commercial", where advertisements for brands endorsed by the characters' actors are frequently interspersed into the film. Zig Marasigan of Rappler described the film's use of product endorsements as "some of the most distasteful examples of local product placement while no effort is made to weave them into the narrative."

In a similar vein to early radio and television programs, sponsored programs in the Philippines are not uncommon, where children's programs like Tropang Potchi and Jollitown were produced on behalf of companies, prominently featuring products and related properties in the shows in question. Notably, the final episode of Maria Clara at Ibarra features product placement from locally produced seasoning product Magic Sarap for humorous, anachronistic reasons.

== Viewer response ==
In April 2009, fans of the television series Chuck responded to a placement by Subway restaurants with a grassroots effort to save the show from cancellation. The movement gained support from cast and crew, with series star Zachary Levi leading hundreds of fans to a Subway restaurant in Birmingham, United Kingdom.

== Criticism ==
Placement continues to grow, despite consumer groups such as Commercial Alert that object to the practice as "an affront to basic honesty". The group requested disclosure of all product-placement arrangements and notification before and during embedded advertisements. It justifies this to allow parents to protect easily influenced children.

In 2005, the Writers Guild of America, a trade union representing authors of television scripts, objected that its members were forced to produce disguised ad copy.

Some argue that product placement may inherently affect the creativity and originality of movies as film producers may re-write scripts in order to incorporate products. Most typically, product placement and merchandise are most successful amongst specific genres of movies which may eventually limit the diversity of films.

== Research ==
=== Effectiveness ===
As with most marketing tactics, product placement leads to explicit as well as implicit advertising effects. Explicit effects can be observed directly and are usually visible by higher recall scores. They are highly connected to the conscious mind. Implicit effects can be observed by a change in behavior – like a higher purchase intention. They are fully based on the subconscious mind. Implicit effects are more relevant for purchase decisions and therefore more valuable than explicit reactions.

According to a 2009 study of product placement in movies from 2002, product placement in movies are effective financially. The study observed the relationship of a company having a product placed in a movie and that company's stock price. After accounting for other variables, the study found that companies on average have their stock price increase by 0.89% due to product placement during the movie's opening.

==== Recall ====
Recall describes whether people can name a product after seeing it within the content. Research showed that there is a significant relationship between product placement and recall.

==== Attitude ====
Product placement also leads to changes in attitude towards the product or brand.

==== Purchase intention ====
A lot of research has shown a higher purchase intention as a result of product placement.

==== Subconscious effects ====
Product placement affects the audience on a conscious, but also subconscious level. Science showed that there does not even need to be an explicit, conscious effect to activate subconscious effects. For example, product placement can lead to an exclusion of competing brands from the consideration set of the audience – subconsciously. It is also hoped to bypass advertising defense reactions of consumers by focusing on the subconscious character of product placement.

==== Negative effects ====
Under specific circumstances, product placement can lead to no or even negative effects. This usually happens if the product placement is too obvious, while the audience also feels it is being manipulated.

==== Placement moderators ====
===== Congruence =====
The better the product placement fits the surrounding content, the better the implicit effectiveness (like attitude or purchase-intention) will be.

===== Audio vs visual =====
After viewing a Seinfeld episode with visual, auditory and audiovisual product placements, a recall task indicated that audiovisual product placements were recalled the best, visual product placements somewhat less and audio placements least. In a recognition test audiovisual was still remembered the best but audio placements were remembered second best and visual placements were remembered third best. As indicated, the type of placement that is most effective seems to vary depending on task, but audiovisual placements seem to be often the most effective. However, audiovisual product placements are not remembered best when there is more than one audiovisual placement at once, making it hard to remember each one. In case the placement is only on the audio level, advertisers must make sure it is very prominent to have any effect at all.

===== Character attractiveness =====
People tended to like brand names that were paired with attractive faces more than those paired with unattractive faces. The more times a brand was paired with an attractive face, the more people liked it.

===== Product prominence =====
Product placement perceived to disrupt a movie, especially when repeated, were found in one study to be counterproductive. Moderate repetition of subtle product placements did not increase people's feelings of distraction.

Products that are integrated within the plot of a movie are better recall, although not if more than one product is shown at a time. In one study placements connected to the story were recognized most often, products used by the main character were remembered less often and products in the background were remembered least often.

Placements were found more effective on a larger screen compared to on a smaller one. Also, products placed in the first half of a movie tend to be remembered better than products in the second half of a movie, which demonstrates the primacy effect.

===== Level of Involvement =====
High involvement with the program makes it easier for people to recognize the product placement. This can lead to positive effects, but might also lead to negative reactions. The same applies for high product category involvement.

=== Audience demographics ===
==== Cultural attributes ====
Older research cited a difference between different cultural areas. For example, Australians, Austrians and Germans tended to evaluate product placement more critically and show less positive reactions than Americans or people from certain Asian countries such as India.

==== Age ====
Children are usually more easily influenced than adults. In a 2013 study on children's (age 6–14) ability to recognize product placement in film; the following results were found. Children between ages 6 and 9 did not understand that a company had to pay for the product to be in the film or had confusion on why a company would pay to have a product appear in a film. After age 10 most children were able to identify that an external company paid for the product to appear. Children between age 6 and 9 could not identify themselves as the target audience for the product placement. After age 10 most children understood that the product placement was targeted towards them. Children between age 6 and 9 could not identify the intention of product placement. Children between age 10 and 12 still had confusion over the intention of a company placing their product in a film. Children over the age of 12 had full understanding of the marketing intentions of a company placing its product in a film.

==== Gender ====
If the product is endorsed by a person, there are stronger priming effects if the audience is the same gender. Women can be influenced more easily, but show more negative reactions when the product can be described as ethically questionable (e.g. alcohol).

=== Measurement ===
Tools

It is very difficult to measure the effect of a product placement on viewers : access to exposed audience, recruitment, interviews, database for results comparison, independence from agencies...

And more of 70 criteria must be analysed to be comprehensive.

To measure the success of product placement, one first tracks the parameters of the placement itself, like the ease of identification, screen time, number of exposure(s), or association with a main character. That information is also often used to determine the price of a specific placement. Secondly, the effectiveness is measured using direct (for explicit memory effects) as well as indirect (for implicit memory effects) measurements.

==== Measurement of the explicit memory ====
Explicit effects are measured by recall or recognition tests. Subjects are asked to name the products that he or she noticed (free recall). This survey can be also aided by giving additional information like a specific product category. At recognition tests, a selection of products is shown to the interviewed person, who then needs to select the ones that he has seen before.

==== Measurement of the implicit memory ====
Implicit effects are measured in an indirect way by observing a change in behavior. This can be done by tracking the consideration set and buying behavior of people, measuring brain activities or using abstract indirect test settings like the word fragment or word stem completion test. The implicit association test (IAT) is also an applicable measurement tool.

==== Valuation ====
Marketers engaging in product placement often employ some form of valuation research to determine the success of a product placement. This involves combining the audience for a placement with traditional linear 30-second spot marketing rates in the market, and using this to create a gross advertising value for the placement. Researchers then assess the quality of the placement itself to determine how much of the gross advertising value the placement captured. The resulting value is known as a Net Placement Value (NPV). International market research firm YouGov has led on developing bespoke modelling and audience solutions to automate the process of creating Net Placement Values for product placements, known as the YouGov Placement Quality Score (PQS).

=== Ethics ===
Many argue that product placement is ethically questionable, because it manipulates people against their will. A contrary view is, even if product placement is only perceived unconsciously, it is still evaluated by our mind. It cannot make people act against their beliefs. Most people also appreciate the fact that movies look more realistic with real brands and do not feel disturbed by the placements. Additionally, further research argues that product placement is not any different from other marketing tactics when it comes to ethics.

== See also ==
- Subliminal advertising
- The Greatest Movie Ever Sold
