= TKA (disambiguation) =

TKA is a Latin Freestyle trio that was prominent in the 1980s and early 1990s.

TKA may refer to:

- Talkeetna Airport, Alaska, United States (IATA airport code TKA)
- Techno Kitten Adventure, an indie game where players control a flying kitten that must avoid obstacles and distractions timed to techno music
- The King's Academy (West Palm Beach, Florida), West Palm Beach, Florida, United States
- The King's Avatar (2017), a Chinese donghua web series
- The King's Avatar (2019), a Chinese TV series
- The Kluger Agency, a full service non-traditional advertising agency in Beverly Hills, California, United States
- Total knee arthroplasty, a surgical procedure for the knee
- Trinidad Karate Association, the largest active organization teaching traditional Japanese Shotokan karate in Trinidad and Tobago
