= Marisa Morán Jahn =

American multimedia artist, writer, educator and activist

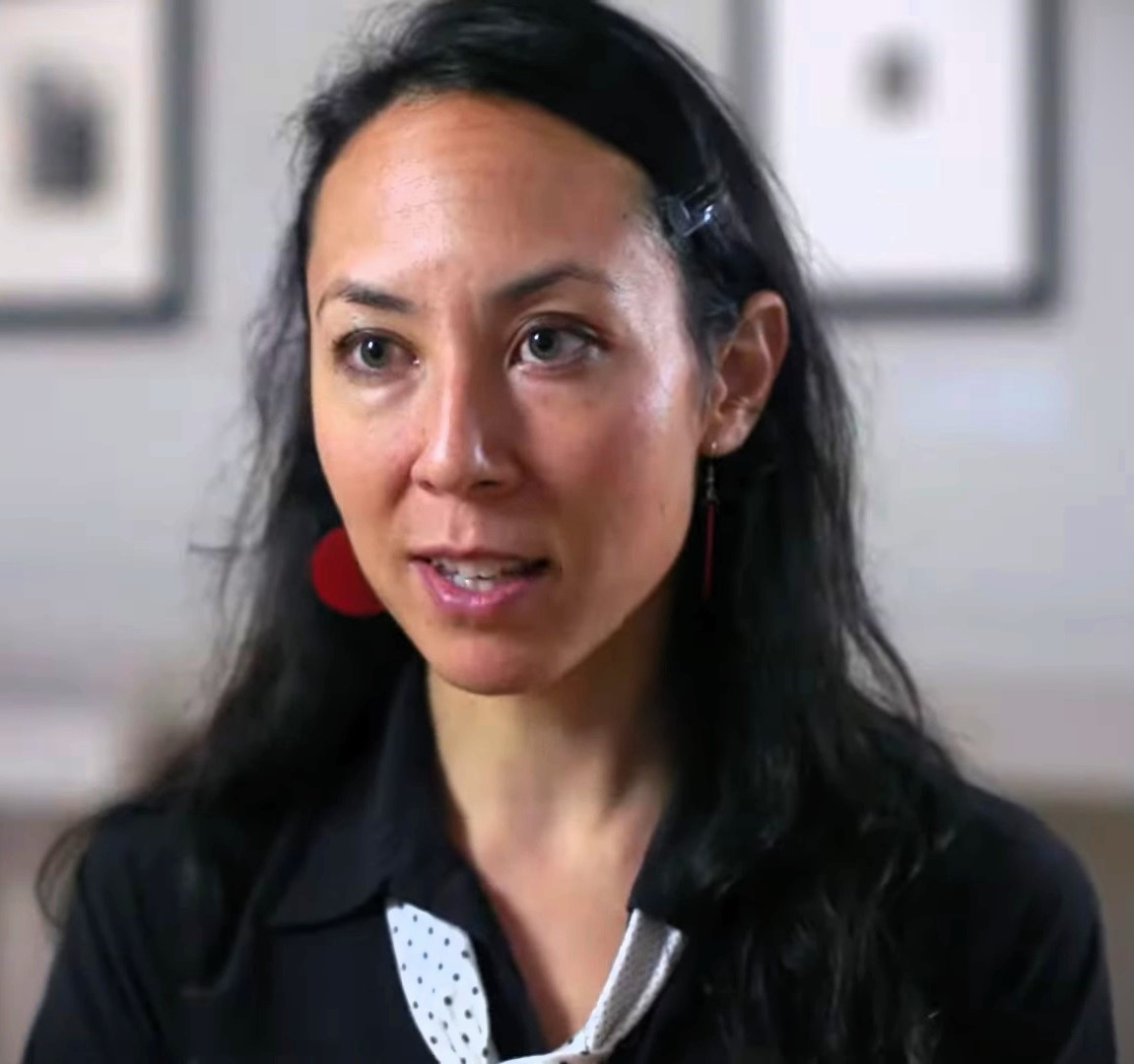
- Marisa Morán Jahn in 2016
- Born: Marisa Jahn; 1977 (age 48–49)
- Other name: Marisa Moran Jahn
- Education: University of California, Berkeley; Massachusetts Institute of Technology
- Known for: Multimedia artist, writer, educator

Marisa Morán Jahn (born 1977), is an American multimedia artist, writer, and educator based in New York City. She is a co-founder and president of Studio REV-, a nonprofit arts organization that creates public art and creative media to impact the lives of low-wage workers, immigrants, youth, and women. She teaches at Massachusetts Institute of Technology (MIT) as a lecturer, Teachers College of Columbia University, and The New School. Jahn has edited three books about art and politics.

== Early life and education ==
Jahn is an American of Chinese and Ecuadorian descent.

She is an alumna of University of California, Berkeley and Massachusetts Institute of Technology (MIT). After graduation, she was a fellow at MIT Media Lab from 2008 to 2010, and an MIT Open Documentary Lab fellow from 2012 to 2014.

== Artwork ==
Jahn's work integrates storytelling, visual art, performance, writing, and film. Her art projects have included the literacy project El Bibliobandido (2010), in which she created workshops and video with a village in El Pital Honduras; a multi-part project of experimental videos on the black market called Video Slink Uganda (2013); Contratados (2014), which is a website to help migrant workers review worksites; NannyVan (2012), public art project, mobile app, and phone hotline; and a public art project, web series, and mobile studio called CareForce (2017), which addresses issues faced by domestic workers.

=== El Bibliobandido (2010 – ongoing) ===
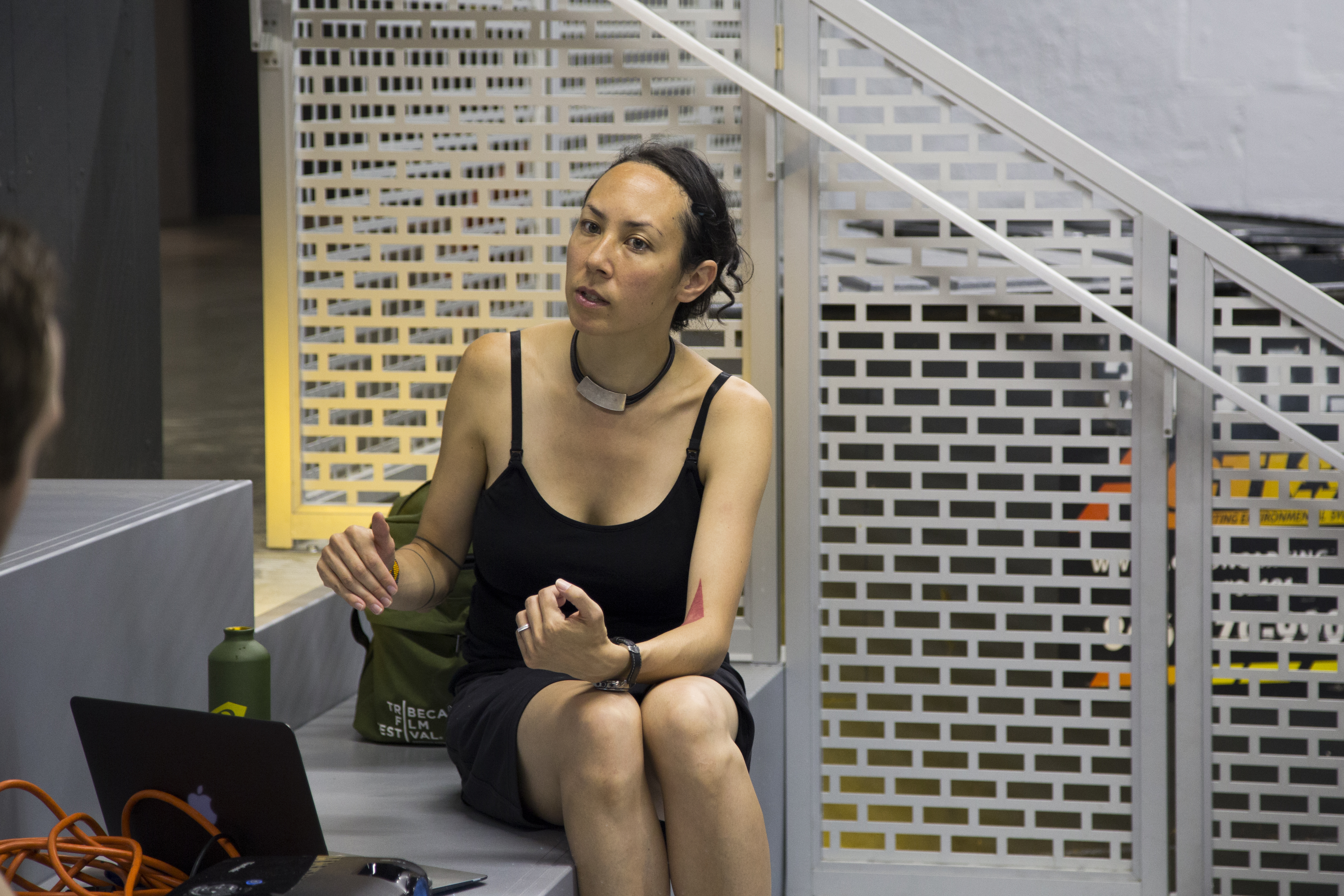
Jahn in 2013

El Bibliobandido (2010) is an ongoing literacy and public art project that centers around a masked bandit that eats stories, terrorizing children until they offer stories they have written. Initiated in El Pital Honduras, a village in the jungles of northwest Honduras where the average rural illiteracy rate is 80%, the community has continued Bibliobandido workshops every month, inventing new characters and episodes with nineteen participating villages.

Jahn has brought the story-eating villain to other venues in North America, including the Pérez Art Museum Miami, 'Caribbean' at the Studio Museum of Harlem, the Stamps Gallery at the Penny W. Stamps School of Art & Design in Ann Arbor, and the Seattle Public Library, which hosts Bibliobandido-themed trainings for librarians citywide.

=== CareForce (2017 – 2018) ===
The CareForce is a public art project and PBS docu-series (2018) co-produced with Oscar and Emmy-winning filmmaker Yael Melamede (SALTY Features), and two mobile studios — the NannyVan and the CareForce One — amplifying the voices of America's fastest growing workforce, caregivers. Created in partnership with advocates like MacArthur Fellow Ai-jen Poo and immigrant women who form the 10,000-strong membership of the National Domestic Workers Alliance, the CareForce uses art, film, participatory dance, and know-your-rights designs to build a movement while informing nannies, housekeepers, caregivers, and their employers about changing laws. The project is made accessible to workers in public spaces, transit stops, and worker centers. It is presented to allies and domestic employers at cultural venues such as the Brooklyn Museum, Pérez Art Museum, and Open Engagement.

=== Video Slink Uganda (2013) ===
In 2013, Jahn collaborated with media ethnographer Paul Falzone and a team of East African video jockeys to create Video Slink Uganda, a Creative Capital and Apexart-supported project that involves slipping or "slinking" experimental films by diasporan artists (Paul D. Miller a.k.a. Dj Spooky, Rashaad Newsome with Kenya Robinson, Akosua Adoma Owusu, Kamau Patton, Zina Saro-Wiwa, Hank Willis Thomas with Terence Nance, and Saya Woolfalk) onto commercially pirated DVDs. Dubbed by local translators, then circulated within Uganda's bootleg cinemas, these slinked videos play as previews to the main film, and have been seen by millions of viewers.

=== New Day, New Standard (2012) ===
In 2012, Studio REV- and Jahn led a collaboration with Domestic Workers United and members of MIT's Center for Civic Media, including Sasha Costanza-Chock, to create a know-your-rights audionovela app called New Day, New Standard (NDNS). The app informs New York-based nannies, housekeepers, and caregivers about their rights under the 2010 landmark Domestic Workers Bill of Rights. Recognized by CNN as one of "five apps to change the world", Jahn presented the project at various venues including the Museum of Modern Art and the White House.

== Curating ==
Jahn and artist and designer Steve Shada founded on New Year's Eve of 1999 a San Francisco-based storefront called "Pond: Art, Activism, and Ideas" located in the Mission District of San Francisco. They held 33 exhibitions at Pond. Three public art projects showcased the work of hundreds of artists including Amy Franceschini with Futurefarmers, Marisa Olson, Judi Werthein, Gregory Sholette, Harrell Fletcher, Lize Mogel, Noam Toran, Robby Herbst, Packard Jennings, Steve Lambert, and Sarah Oppenheimer.

In 2003, Pond produced Natalie Jeremijenko's OneTrees project, which involved planting pairs of genetically-identical trees in 16 microclimates throughout San Francisco.

In 2009, Jahn co-founded Studio REV- with Stephanie Rothenberg and Rachel McIntire, a non-profit organization that co-designs public art and creative media with low-wage workers, immigrants, women, and youth.

== Awards and honors ==
Jahn is the recipient of various awards from institutions including Creative Capital, Sundance Institute, Tribeca Film Institute's New Media Fund, Rockefeller Foundation, and National Endowment for the Arts (NEA). She is a recipient of the 2017 Anonymous Was A Woman Award, from Philanthropy Advisors, LLC, and was shortlisted for the Visible Award in 2019.

== Publications ==
- The book Recipes for an Encounter (2009) examines anticipatory nature of recipes together with their promise of what will unfold, take place, be consumed.
- Jahn, Marisa; Hopkins, Candice; Golonu, Berin, eds. (2009). Recipes for an Encounter. Vancouver, Canada: Western Front. ISBN 9780920974476.
- Jahn, Marisa, ed. (2011). Byproduct: On the Excess of Embedded Art Practices. Claire Bishop (contributor), Peter Eleey (contributor), Lev Kreft (contributor), Pedro Reyes (contributor), The Yes Men (contributor). YYZ Books, Studio REV-. ISBN 978-0920397510.
- Jahn, Marisa, ed. (2012). Pro+agonist: The Art of Opposition. Walker Art Center, Studio REV-, Anjum Asharia (contributor), John Seely Brown (contributor), D. Graham Burnett & Cornel West (contributor), Carl DiSalvo (contributor), Jean-Francois Lyotard (contributor), Chantal Mouffe (contributor), Warren Sack (contributor), Steve Shada (contributor), Mark Shepard (contributor), McKenzie Wark (contributor). MN: Northern Lights, Walker Art Center. ISBN 978-0985185305.
