= Cerveza Cristal =

Chilean beer brand

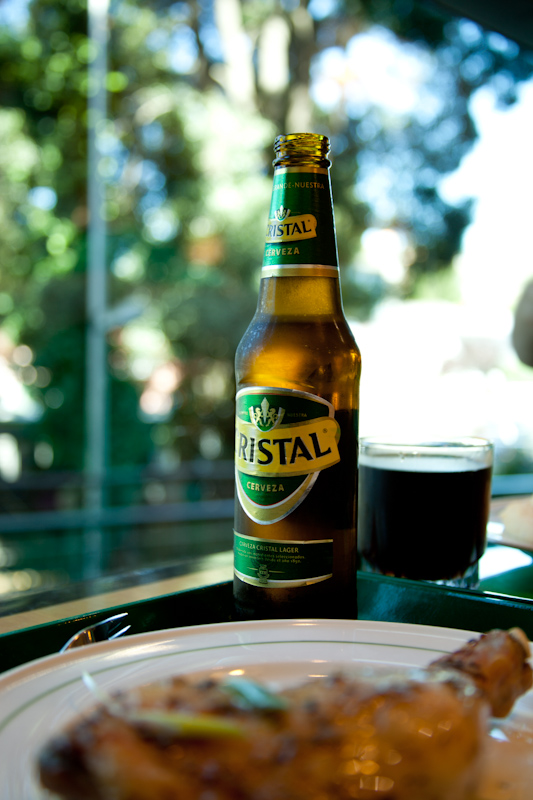
- Type: Beer
- Manufacturer: CCU
- Origin: Chile
- Introduced: 1977
- Website: www.cristal.cl

Cerveza Cristal (lit. Crystal Beer) is a Chilean brand of pilsner beer, introduced in 1977 and sold by Compañía de Cervecerías Unidas (CCU).

== History ==
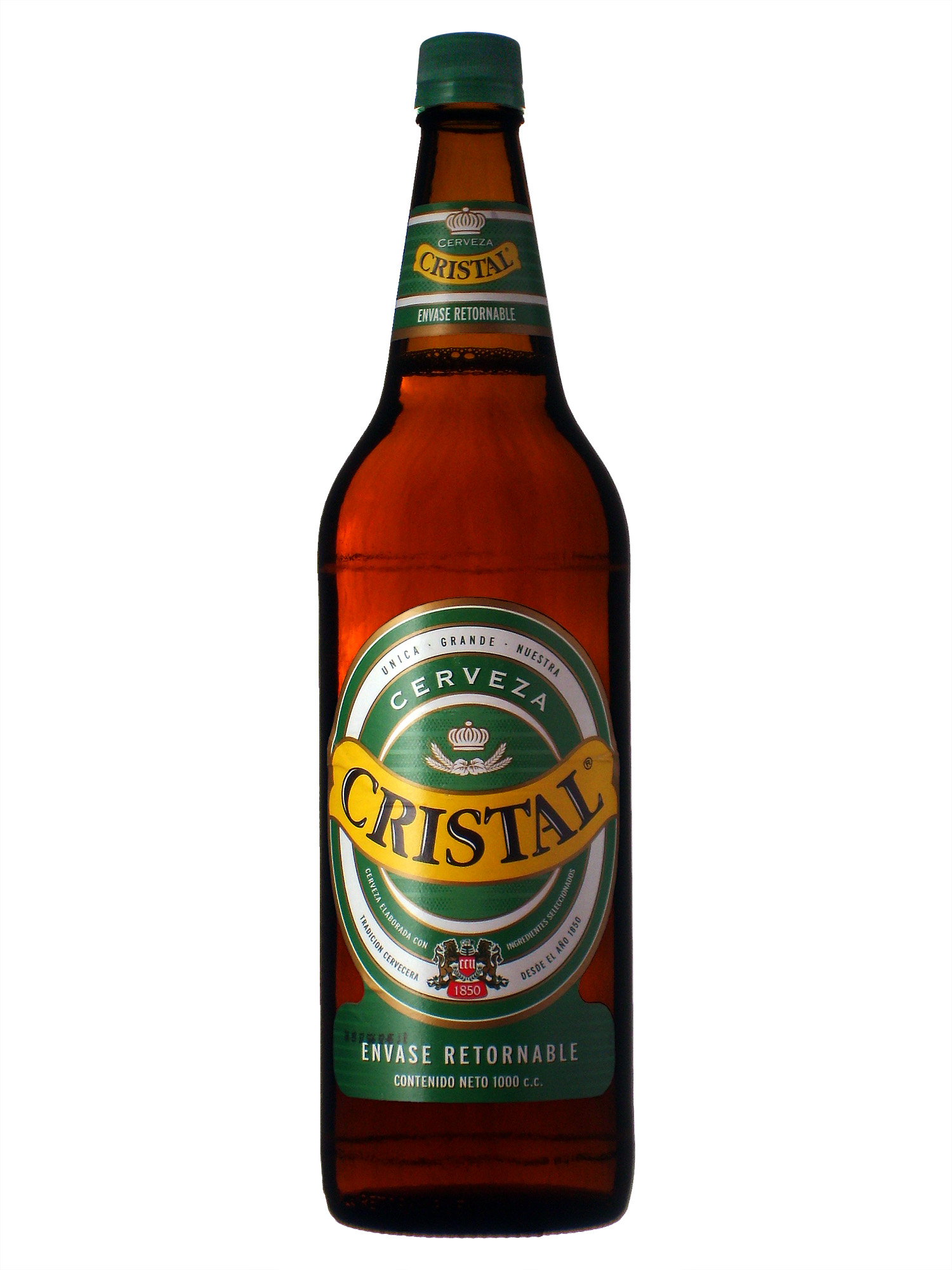
Cerveza Cristal bottle from 2006.

The brand was registered as "Pilsener Cristal" in August 1977 and its commercial launch occurred in 1978. In 1993, it was relaunched as "Cerveza Cristal", and in that same year, it adopted the motto "Única, Grande y Nuestra" ("Unique, Great and Ours").

In 2008, a non-alcoholic version was launched on the market, called "Cristal Cero", to which "Cristal Cero Radler" was added in 2016, which contains lemon juice. In 2023, a limited edition called "Cristal Orígenes" ("Cristal Origins") was presented as a tribute to the three natural regions of Chile: the northern zone with a touch of limón de Pica, the central zone with a touch of honey, and the southern zone with a touch of berries.

== Marketing ==
In December 2003, CCU commissioned a series of commercials for Cerveza Cristal, which were broadcast at the beginning of each advertising period during the broadcast of Star Wars saga films on Canal 13, so that the spots seemed to be continuations of the preceding scenes. In A New Hope, for example, the scene where Obi-Wan Kenobi opens a chest to show Luke Skywalker his father's lightsaber is edited seamlessly to have the former hold a Cerveza Cristal complete with its jingle. The campaign, titled The Force is with Cristal Beer, was awarded at various international events.

The campaign resurfaced as an internet meme in 2024 applied to other movies and media to lighten up usually intense or dramatic scenes.
