= The Force is with Cristal Beer =

2003 advertising campaign

- Scene from one of the commercials, in which a pair of hands (similar to those of Obi-Wan Kenobi in the film) open a chest and take a bottle of Cristal beer.
- Agency: OMD Chile; Efex
- Client: CCU
- Market: Chile
- Language: Spanish
- Media: Television
- Product: Cristal
- Release date: December 2003
- Country: Chile

The Force is with Cristal Beer (Spanish: La Fuerza está con Cerveza Cristal) is a series of television commercials made for Cerveza Cristal (owned by Compañía de las Cervecerías Unidas (CCU)), broadcast in Chile in December 2003 during broadcasts of the original Star Wars trilogy films on Canal 13.

== Synopsis ==
The commercials, which were separated from the broadcast of the film by only a black frame, were inserted in such a way that they appeared to be continuations of scenes from the film. For example, in a scene from Star Wars: Episode IV – A New Hope, Obi-Wan Kenobi gets up from his seat to open a chest, which is followed by the commercial where a hand (dressed similar to Obi-Wan's) opens an ice chest containing bottles of Cristal beer. The brand's characteristic jingle then plays and its logo appears on the screen, before cutting to the next set of ads during the commercial break.

In other commercials aired during these broadcasts, Luke Skywalker in The Empire Strikes Back can be seen in a scene reaching for his lightsaber, but instead grabs a can of Cristal beer, or Palpatine in Return of the Jedi using The Force to levitate a can into his hand.

The series of commercials was made for CCU by the advertising agencies OMD Chile and Efex. Felipe Wielandt, brand manager who supervised the project, noted that the campaign sought to "reach consumers that are becoming increasingly aloof".

== Reactions and legal issues ==
Due to the success of the broadcast of the commercials, CCU decided to carry out a new campaign called Breaking Zapping (Spanish: Rompiendo el Zapping), with new commercials inserted as continuations of scenes during the broadcasts of other films, such as American Beauty, Gladiator and Notting Hill, broadcast also on Canal 13 during February and March 2004. The Breaking Zapping campaign received the Grand Prix in the Media category at the 2004 ACHAP Awards, and the Great Innovative Eye at the Ibero-American Eye Awards (Spanish: Premios Ojo de Iberoamérica).

In June 2004, the original campaign won the Media Grand Prix at the Cannes Lions International Festival of Creativity, the first time that a Chilean company received this award; it also won the awards for Best Use of Television and in the Young Adult category (18–39 years old). In 2009, the commercial series entered the Ibero-American Hall of Fame.

Ad Age noted that the campaign, which blurred the line between television content and commercials, probably could not be aired in the United States "without invoking the fury of George Lucas". On 15 September 2004, Lucasfilm filed a claim before the Council for Self-Regulation and Advertising Ethics of Chile (Spanish: Consejo de Autorregulación y Ética Publicitaria, CONAR), alleging violations of copyright and the Chilean Code of Advertising Ethics, especially with regard to the discernment of the commercial for the audience by being linked to the scene that preceded it during the broadcast of the film. On December 15 of the same year, CONAR accepted Lucasfilm's claim, conceding that the advertising in question could not be used again.

== Legacy ==
The campaign came to international attention in March 2024 after video clips of it were posted online. The campaign was parodied on Twitter with edited versions of other films such as The Lord of the Rings, Seven, and Dune. On the 5 March 2024 edition of The Late Show with Stephen Colbert, Colbert covered the internet memes surrounding the campaign and ended his opening monologue by holding up a bottle of the beer, accompanied by the original jingle.

On 14 March 2024, during a broadcast of El Día Menos Pensado on TVN, an advertisement was added to a scene in the same style as The Force is with Cristal Beer as a transition to the commercial break. In the sequence, the protagonist of the chapter opens a pantry in his kitchen to find cans of the alcoholic beverage.

== See also ==
- Product placement
