= The Kluger Agency =

Music product placement

- Type: Private
- Industry: Advertising, Music
- Founded: 2008
- Headquarters: Beverly Hills, California & Miami Beach, Florida
- Key people: Adam Kluger, CEO
- Services: Brand Partnerships, Product Placement (Music)
- Website: Official website

The Kluger Agency (TKA) is a music management firm and advertising agency with a focus on product placement within the music industry. The agency represents over sixty brands, partnering them with artists in the music industry.

== History ==
The agency was founded in late 2007 or early 2008 by Adam Kluger, when he was twenty-two years old. He is known for placing the advertisement of products within the medium of popular music.

Adam Kluger established the agency in 2008 by making over 400 telephone calls, claiming to vendors that he could get their brands into popular songs, then claiming to record labels that he could get brands to pay for promotions. In Kluger's words, "there's a bit of bullsh-----g you have to do to get in the door". He eventually got through to Steve Berman, head of marketing for Interscope Records, a label promoting bands such as The Pussycat Dolls. His first product placement was for a lingerie manufacturer whose branding is displayed on a shopping bag of cash in a one-second appearance in Lady Gaga's music video "Beautiful, Dirty, Rich".

An advertisement for Plenty of Fish in 2010 Lady Gaga/Beyoncé Knowles video "Telephone" yielded a 20% increase in traffic to the site in the month following the song's release. Plenty of Fish has also placed paid promotions in Jason Derulo’s “Ridin' Solo” and Akon/Flo Rida’s “Available”, according to a Forbes magazine blog which estimates placement deals bring in $10 million a year for Kluger as its cut of revenue from "roughly 100 videos and five or six songs per year". BusinessWeek estimates advertisers pay $40,000 to $250,000 per placement, of which Kluger retains up to 23%. Placing a brand into the song's lyrics may cost a half-million dollars or more.

The Kluger Agency has worked with a range of stars including Akon, Jason Derulo, Drake, Lady Gaga, Keri Hilson, Beyoncé Knowles, Jennifer Lopez, Flo Rida, Britney Spears, DJ Khaled, LMFAO, Kesha, Uncle Kracker, Rick Ross, T-Pain, Timbaland, Lil Wayne, Christina Aguilera, and Eminem.

== "Brand-dropping" ==
The Kluger Agency coined the term "brand-dropping" to describe the product placement of brands into song lyrics or visual representations during a music video. According to the agency's founder, the process involves finding places where a musical artist is likely to mention a specific product in their song, and to match this with companies that produce those products. The process tries to integrate product placement and song writing, in order to create an unnoticeable form of advertising that preserves artistic integrity but also provides the artist with additional revenue from their work.

Kluger has stated that, "At the end of the day, since sales are down and pirating is up, a lot of company’s budgets for videos are down ... So in order for the artist to support their vision, a lot of times they need a brand to come onboard to help support it financially." Kluger claims product placements allow performers to monetise the ongoing copyright infringement of their works as "obviously if the song is pirated, the lyrics aren’t going to change” and provide musicians with a larger budget to produce music videos.

== Reactions and reviews ==
In 2008, the agency was criticized in a Wired magazine blog post after it was alleged that they had sent an unsolicited email offering to place advertising for Double Happiness Jeans in a Pussycat Dolls tune. The company was virtual and not intended to represent a viable commercial product; the project was a collaboration between Jeff Crouse of the Anti-Advertising Agency and Stephanie Rothenberg, and was intended to be a critical piece.

Britney Spears's music video for "Hold It Against Me", which incorporates placements by The Kluger Agency for clients including Plenty of Fish, was described by TMZ as containing a half-million dollars in advertising and negatively reviewed by Vanity Fair. A Washington Post review described the video as an "infomercial" with "undisguised, un-subtle in-video brand cameos". According to The Hollywood Reporter in 2012, Christina Aguilera's inclusion of the psychic hotline Oranum in her music video Your Body led to a 450% increase in the social media following of Oranum within the span of a few days.
