= Judi Werthein =

Argentine artist

Judi Werthein (born 1967) is an Argentine artist.

== Early life and education ==
Werthein was born in Buenos Aires in 1967. In 1993, she received a Masters of Architecture from the University of Buenos Aires.

== Career ==
In 2007 she exhibited at Art in General, in New York City. In 2011, her film Do you Have Time? was presented at the Aldrich Contemporary Art Museum.

Her work is included in the collection of the Tate Museum, London and the Guggenheim Museum.
