= Trinidad and Tobago Karate Union =

Karate in Trinidad and Tobago

- Sport: Karate
- Jurisdiction: National
- Abbreviation: TTKU
- Affiliation: World Karate Federation (WKF)
- Regional affiliation: Panamerican Karate Federation

The Trinidad and Tobago Karate Union (TTKU) is the National Governing Body for the sport of Karate in Trinidad and Tobago. The TTKU is affiliated to the World Karate Federation (WKF) which is the only world karate organization recognised by the International Olympic Committee.

== Founding Members ==
- Acherson Wells - S.K.O.T.T
- Anthony Sydney - Goshin-Do Karate Dojo
- Neville Mason - S.K.I.F.T.T.
- Cosmos Simpson - TTSKD
- Zaid Mohammed - JKO Trinidad
- Selwyn Tom Pack - UWI Karate Club

== TTKU Member Clubs ==
- Goshin-Do Karate Dojo - Anthony Sydney
- Shotokan Karate International Federation of Trinidad & Tobago (S.K.I.F.T.T.) - Neville Mason
- Trinidad Associated Schools of Karate (TASK) - Anthony Peters
- Tobago Shotokan Karate Club (TSKC) - Arthur Morris
- Trinity Almighty Karatekas (TAK) - Simeon Stanislaus
- Kachi Make - Curtis Carrera
- Okinawan-Te Shorin-Ryu Karate & Kobudo (OSKK) - Shiva Sookdeo
- Taekajudo Martial Arts Academy (TMAA) - Junior Codrington
- Shotokan Karate International Federation Kanazawa Group (SKIFKGTT) - Ian Sammy
- Trinidad and Tobago Shotokan Karate Dojo (TTSKD) - Cosmos Simpson
- Fudoshin Shotokan Karate-do (FSKD) - Ricardo Wooding
- International Karate Daigaku of Trinidad & Tobago (TKA) - Wesley Dexter Shim
- International Shotokan Karate Federation Trinidad & Tobago (ISKF-TT) - Michael Alexander
- Trinidad and Tobago Sport Martial Arts Elite (Team Elite Karate) - Barry Winter

== International Competition ==
The TTKU since its inception has fielded formidable international competitors. In 2001, Trinidad hosted the PKF Pan American Junior Championships with 2 athletes, Richard Djerf and Brendon Strong both winning gold in Kumite in their respective divisions. Brendon Strong also won a silver medal in Kumite at the Pan American Senior Karate Championships in 2005.

In 2006, TTKU won its first medal for Karate at the Central American and Caribbean Games in the Women's Team Kata, capturing a bronze medal. In the 2010 Central American and Caribbean Games, a silver medal was captured by Kwame Kinsale in the +84kg Kumite division which then qualified him for the Pan American Games in 2011, a first for Trinidad and Tobago Karate.

In 2011, Trinidad amassed a total of 10 medals at the Central American and Caribbean Karate Championships in Barbados. That same year, Zachary Alexander represented Trinidad at the Welsh Open winning a bronze medal in Adult Male Kata.
