= Stephanie Rothenberg =

American artist based in New York

- Born: Newark, New Jersey, U.S.
- Education: School of the Art Institute of Chicago
- Known for: Internet Art; Performance Art; New Media Art
- Notable work: Best Practices in Banana Time; Invisible Threads; Garden of Virtual Kinship
- Awards: Harpo Foundation, Creative Capital Emerging Practices (2009)

Stephanie Rothenberg is an American artist who lives and works in Buffalo, New York and Brooklyn, New York. Rothenberg's interdisciplinary practice combines elements of performance and installations with networked media in the creation of public interactions.

== Background ==
Stephanie Rothenberg graduated with a master's degree from the Department of Film, Video, and New Media at the School of the Art Institute of Chicago in 2003. Rothenberg is an associate professor of the Department of Art at the University at Buffalo, SUNY where she teaches within Design and Emerging Practices.

== Collaborations ==
In 2009, Stephanie Rothenberg co-founded Studio REV- with Rachel McIntire and Marisa Morán Jahn.

Rothenberg has collaborated with Jeff Crouse, Byron Rich, Bobby Gryzynger, Brian Clark, and Megan Michalak among others.

== Notable work ==
- Best Practices in Banana Time - a live performance talk show about leisure and labor in the digital realm that occurs simultaneously in the virtual environment Second Life and in a physical theater. The project has been performed at MASS MoCA (with the exhibition “The Workers”), 01SJ Biennial (2010), and Hallwalls among other venues.
- Invisible Threads (aka Double Happiness Jeans or Double Happiness Manufacturing) - a collaboration with Jeff Crouse. Double Happiness is a sweatshop manufacturing plant in Second Life to build jeans based on orders made in real life. The jeans are designed and assembled in the factory and then delivered back into real life by being printed on fabric via a large format printer. The result is a tangible, wearable (however impractical) pair of pants. The project began in 2007 and was shown at the 2008 Sundance Film Festival in the New Frontiers exhibition. In 2008, Wired Magazine reported that the Kluger Agency, a product placement advertising company, contacted Rothenberg's collaborator Jeff Crouse of the Anti-Advertising Company and Double Happiness Jeans in an attempt to attract the company to "participate in a brand integration campaign" by purchasing mention within a forthcoming Pussycat Dolls song.
- The Garden of Virtual Kinship - Rothenberg created a live networked garden of plant beds in the shape of continents, to form a world map that plotted real-time monetary exchange data from online crowdfunded charity projects onto the geographic regions that benefit from the transactions. The project has been presented at Center for Art and Media Karlsruhe among other venues.
