= Jeff Crouse =

American digital artist

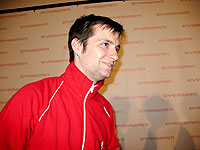
- Born: Jeffrey Robert Crouse; September 10, 1980 (age 45); Baltimore, Maryland
- Education: New York University Gallatin School of Individualized Study, MS from Georgia Institute of Technology
- Known for: Internet Art
- Notable work: Invisible Threads
- Awards: 2008 Turbulence Commission, 2008 Sundance New Frontiers

Jeff Crouse (born September 10, 1980 in Baltimore, Maryland) is an American artist and hacker/creative technologist who works with live data feeds from the internet to make art works.

== Background ==
Crouse's undergraduate study in Computer Science and Fiction Writing led to creating works that continued the history of automatic writing through using computers, code, and dynamic sources on the internet. Interactive Frank, for example, used sources on the internet to create dynamically generated audio programs reminiscent of public radio pioneer, Joe Frank. Another example is ChinASCII a video game based on the life Charles Bukowski.

In order to facilitate his projects, Crouse developed Switchboard a library for Processing. Switchboard allows "artists and designers to easily use a variety of live data sources for digital art".

After completing a Master of Science degree in Information Design and Technology at Georgia Tech in 2006, Crouse began a Production Fellowship at Eyebeam in 2006 and in 2007 he became a Senior Fellow.

He is on the Add-Art advisory committee.

== Notable works ==
- Invisible Threads (aka Double Happiness Jeans or Double Happiness Manufacturing) - a collaboration with Stephanie Rothenberg. Double Happiness is a sweatshop manufacturing plant in Second Life to build jeans based on orders made in real life. The jeans are designed and assembled in the factory and then delivered back into real life by being printed on fabric via a large format printer. The result is a tangible, wearable (however impractical) pair of pants. The project began in 2007 and was shown at the 2008 Sundance Film Festival in the New Frontiers exhibition.

== Awards ==
- 2022 Gerald Loeb Award for Personal Finance and Personal Service
