= The Life and Loves of a She-Devil =

Book by Fay Weldon

- First edition (UK)
- Author: Fay Weldon
- Language: English
- Genre: Novel
- Publisher: Hodder & Stoughton (UK); Ballantine Books (US)
- Publication date: 1983
- Publication place: United Kingdom
- Media type: Print (Hardback & Paperback)
- Followed by: Death of a She Devil

The Life and Loves of a She-Devil is a 1983 novel by British feminist author Fay Weldon. A story about a highly unattractive woman who goes to great lengths to take revenge on her husband and his attractive lover, Weldon stated that the book is about envy, rather than revenge.

The novel was adapted into a BBC television serial in 1986 and an American comedy film, She Devil, in 1989.

== Plot ==
Ruth is an abnormally tall and ugly housewife whose husband, Bobbo, considers their relationship an open marriage based on convenience alone and only married her because he got her pregnant when they were teenagers. Bobbo only truly loves his mistress Mary Fisher, a famous, wealthy romance novelist. When Ruth passionately indicates her disapproval for Bobbo's extramarital affair, he calls her a "she-devil", causing her to reassess her life. She resolves to behave in accordance with the label he has given her.

Bobbo leaves Ruth and their two children and goes to live with Mary, to whom he soon proposes. Ruth plots her revenge on them, beginning by burning down her own house, therefore forcing the children to live with their father at Mary's lavish home which is a converted lighthouse. Ruth engages in a string of meaningless sexual relationships in order to emotionally detach herself from sex. In the meantime, she works at the retirement home which houses Mary's mother, Pearl. Her actions there cause Pearl to be expelled from the home, thus inconveniencing Mary and Bobbo who must now care for her.

Ruth finds work at a psychiatric hospital while taking classes in accounting and bookkeeping. She uses this knowledge to discreetly steal money from Bobbo's corporate clientele in a way that will incriminate Bobbo later on. Ruth starts her own employment agency for female secretaries, under the alias of "Vesta Rose". Through her agency, she sends a secretary to Bobbo's office who begins another affair with him. When the police arrive to arrest Bobbo, Ruth has made it appear as though he and the secretary were going to take the stolen money to Switzerland and leave the country, though with the assistance of the same secretary, Ruth is in possession of the money herself, becoming rich as a result. Ruth, nonetheless feels slight sympathy for the secretary and encourages her to send a letter revealing the affair to Mary then arranges for her to take a new job in New Zealand so she can evade the police. The stress and subsequent expense of his arrest after the problems created by unexpectedly being forced to share her home with Bobbo's children, pets and her mother has detrimental effect on Mary's physical and mental wellbeing, as a result her writing suffers, leading to further financial struggles.

Under a new alias, Ruth works as a nanny for the children of the judge who presides over Bobbo's trial, satisfying his masochistic desires and successfully persuading him to extend Bobbo's prison sentence if he is convicted. Bobbo is found guilty and imprisoned. While a desperate Mary turns toward religion for guidance, Ruth manipulates the entire situation by seducing and corrupting a priest, Father Ferguson, and sending him to Mary. Ruth continues to recreate herself with a variety of aliases and love affairs.

Ruth uses her money to change her lifestyle and appearance, undergoing over several years, a series of surgeries to completely restructure her body to be identical to Mary. Mary continues to love Bobbo, spends her entire fortune on Bobbo's trial and finally wastes away, developing cancer and ultimately dying. Before her death the mansion is purchased by Ruth. Ruth even attends Mary's funeral, externally looking like her. She hires Mary's former manservant and lover Garcia. Ruth now lives a life of wealth, extravagance, and control, and plans to sexually dominate Bobbo once she secures his release from prison, causing him the misery that he once caused her.

== Editions ==
Paperback editions of the novel were issued in 1993 by Ballantine Books, New York (ISBN 0-345-32375-0) and by Sceptre, London (ISBN 0-340-58935-3).

== Sequel ==
A sequel, Death of a She Devil, was released in the U.K. in 2017.

== In other media ==
| | Mini-series | Movie | Radio |
| | The Life and Loves of a She-Devil | She-Devil | The Life and Loves of a She-Devil |
|---|---|---|---|
| Year of Release | 1986 | 1989 | 2016 |
| Directed by | Philip Saville | Susan Seidelman | Abigail le Fleming |
| Screenplay by | Ted Whitehead | Barry Strugatz | Joy Wilkinson |
| Length | 4 x 60 mins. | 100 mins. | 106 mins. |
Cast and Characters
| Ruth | Julie T. Wallace | Roseanne Barr | |
| Bobbo / Bob | Dennis Waterman | Ed Begley, Jr. | |
| Mary Fisher | Patricia Hodge | Meryl Streep | |
| Nicola / Nicolette | Caroline Butler | Elisebeth Peters | |
| Andy / Andrew | Christopher Mossford | Bryan Larkin | |

=== Television ===
The novel was adapted in 1986 as an award-winning BBC television serial, starring Patricia Hodge as Mary Fisher, Dennis Waterman as Bobbo and Julie T. Wallace as Ruth, with only minor changes from the book.

=== Movies ===
The novel was adapted less faithfully by Hollywood in 1989 as She-Devil, starring Roseanne Barr as Ruth and Meryl Streep as her adversary, Mary.

The 1995 film Sathi Leelavathi has a very similar plot to 1989's She-Devil.

=== Radio ===
The BBC Radio 4 adaptation was broadcast as a Classic Serial on 21 and 28 February 2016, total duration 106 minutes.
