= List of awards and nominations received by Joan Cusack =

Joan Cusack awards and nominations
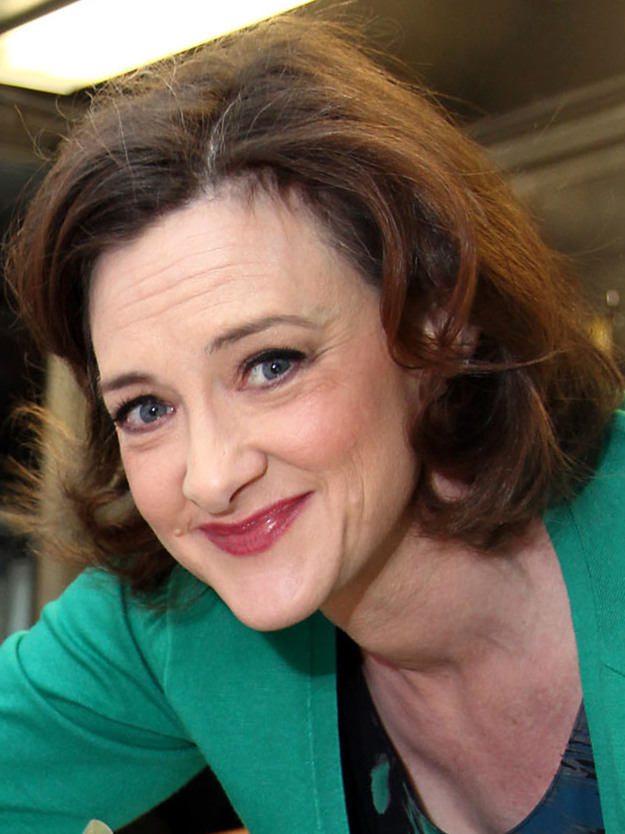
- Cusack in 2009
Awards and nominations
Award	Wins	Nominations
Academy Awards	0	2
Daytime Emmy Awards	0	1
Golden Globes	0	1
Primetime Emmy Awards	1	5

Totals (Note: Certain award groups do not simply award one winner. They acknowledge several different recipients, have runners-up, and have third place. Since this is a specific recognition and is different from losing an award, runner-up mentions are considered wins in this award tally. For simplification and to avoid errors, each award in this list has been presumed to have had a prior nomination.)
- Wins: 14
- Nominations: 35

Joan Cusack is an American actress and comedian.

She has appeared in minor roles in classic films of the 1980s, including Sixteen Candles (1984), Broadcast News (1987), Working Girl (1988), and Say Anything... (1989). She continued working in supporting roles in film such as the romantic comedy Nine Months (1995), the thriller Grosse Point Blank (1997), the comedy In & Out (1997), the romantic comedy Runaway Bride (1998), the romance High Fidelity (2000), the musical School of Rock (2003), and the coming-of-age film The Perks of Being a Wallflower (2012). She is also known for her voice as Jessie the Cowgirl in the Pixar animated Toy Story franchise (1999–2026) and in Chicken Little (2005), and Arthur Christmas (2011). She starred in the Showtime series Shameless (2011–2015).

Cusack has been nominated for two Academy Awards for Best Supporting Actress for her performances in Mike Nichols' Working Girl (1988) and for the Frank Oz comedy In & Out (1997). She has also received five consecutive Primetime Emmy Award nominations for her performance as Sheila Gallagher in Shameless. She won the award for Outstanding Guest Actress in a Comedy Series for the show's fifth and her character's final season.

== Major associations ==
=== Academy Awards ===
Year	Category	Nominated work	Result	Ref.
1989	Best Supporting Actress	Working Girl	Nominated	
1998	Best Supporting Actress	In & Out	Nominated	

=== Emmy Awards ===
Year	Category	Nominated work	Result	Ref.
Primetime Emmy Awards
2011	Outstanding Guest Actress in a Drama Series	Shameless (episode: "Frank Gallagher: Loving Husband, Devoted Father")	Nominated	
2012	Outstanding Guest Actress in a Drama Series	Shameless (episode: "Can I Have a Mother")	Nominated	
2013	Outstanding Guest Actress in a Drama Series	Shameless (episode: "A Long Way from Home")	Nominated	
2014	Outstanding Guest Actress in a Comedy Series	Shameless (episode: "Liver, I Hardly Know Her")	Nominated	
2015	Outstanding Guest Actress in a Comedy Series	Shameless (episode: "Milk of the Gods")	Won	
Daytime Emmy Awards
2005	Outstanding Performer in an Animated Program	Peep and the Big Wide World	Nominated	

=== Golden Globes ===
Year	Category	Nominated work	Result	Ref.
1998	Best Supporting Actress – Motion Picture	In & Out	Nominated	

== Miscellaneous awards ==
Year	Association	Category	Nominated work	Result	Ref.
1989	American Comedy Awards	Funniest Supporting Actress – Motion Picture	Working Girl	Won	
1989	Boston Society of Film Critics Awards	Best Supporting Actress	Married to the Mob; Stars and Bars; Working Girl	Won	
1991	Chicago Film Critics Association Awards	Best Supporting Actress	Men Don't Leave	Nominated	
1991	Chicago Film Critics Association Awards	Most Promising Actress	Men Don't Leave	Nominated	
1994	American Comedy Awards	Funniest Supporting Actress – Motion Picture	Addams Family Values	Nominated	
1994	Saturn Awards	Best Supporting Actress	Addams Family Values	Nominated	
1996	American Comedy Awards	Funniest Supporting Actress – Motion Picture	Nine Months	Nominated	
1997	Boston Society of Film Critics Awards	Best Supporting Actress	In & Out	Runner-up	
1997	New York Film Critics Circle Awards	Best Supporting Actress	In & Out	Won	
1997	Society of Texas Film Critics Awards	Best Supporting Actress	In & Out	Won	
1998	American Comedy Awards	Funniest Supporting Actress – Motion Picture	In & Out	Won	
1998	Blockbuster Entertainment Awards	Favorite Actress – Comedy	In & Out	Nominated	
1998	Chicago Film Critics Association Awards	Best Supporting Actress	In & Out	Nominated	
1998	Critics' Choice Awards	Best Supporting Actress	In & Out	Won	
1998	Satellite Awards	Best Supporting Actress – Comedy or Musical	In & Out	Won	
1998	Chlotrudis Awards	Best Supporting Actress	Grosse Pointe Blank; In & Out	Won	
1998	Online Film Critics Society Awards	Best Supporting Actress	Grosse Pointe Blank	Nominated	
2000	American Comedy Awards	Funniest Supporting Actress – Motion Picture	Runaway Bride	Won	
2000	Blockbuster Entertainment Awards	Favorite Supporting Actress – Comedy/Romance	Runaway Bride	Won	
2000	Chicago Film Critics Association Awards	Commitment to Chicago Award	—N/a	Won	
2000	Chlotrudis Awards	Best Supporting Actress	Arlington Road; Toy Story 2 Runaway Bride	Nominated	
2000	Saturn Awards	Best Supporting Actress	Arlington Road	Nominated	
2000	Annie Awards	Best Female Voice Acting in a Feature Production	Toy Story 2	Won	
2000	Teen Choice Awards	Choice Hissy Fit	Toy Story 2	Nominated	
2026	Kids' Choice Awards	Favorite Female Animated Voice from a Movie	Toy Story 5	Nominated	
2026	Kids' Choice Awards	Favorite On-Screen Duo/Trio (Note: Nomination shared with Tim Allen and Tom Hanks.)	Toy Story 5	Nominated	
