= Sally Head =

British television producer (1947–2026)

Sarah Daphne Head (20 February 1947 – 18 May 2026), known as Sally Head, was a British television producer. She began her career as a television script editor, then worked as a producer, mainly for the BBC.

Head's credits as producer included First Born (1988) and The Life and Loves of a She-Devil (1986), and she was executive producer of the first four Prime Suspect television films. She also worked on seminal Granada dramas such as Cracker and Band of Gold.

She founded Sally Head Productions, her own production company, in 1997 with co-directors Gwenda Bagshaw, John Howard and Sarah Simpson.

Head died of cancer on 18 May 2026, aged 79.

== Television credits ==
- Fanny Hill (2007)
- A Good Murder (2006)
- Fingersmith (2005)
- The Return (2003)
- The Mayor of Casterbridge (2003)
- Tipping the Velvet (2002)
- The Cry (2002)
- Four Fathers (1999)
- Plastic Man (1999)
- Jumping the Queue (1989)
- First Born (1988)
- The Marksman (1987)
- Breaking Up (1986)
- The Life and Loves of a She-Devil (1986)
- The Detective (1985)
