= Boston Society of Film Critics Awards 1988 =

Annual US film awards ceremony

9th BSFC Awards

1989

Best Film:
Bull Durham

The 9th Boston Society of Film Critics Awards honored the best filmmaking of 1988. The awards were given in 1989.

== Winners ==
- Best Film:
  - Bull Durham
- Runner-up: Mississippi Burning
- Best Actor:
  - Daniel Day-Lewis – The Unbearable Lightness of Being
- Runner-up: Gene Hackman – Mississippi Burning
- Best Actress:
  - Melanie Griffith – Working Girl
- Runner-up: Jodie Foster – The Accused
- Best Supporting Actor:
  - Dean Stockwell – Married to the Mob and Tucker: The Man and His Dream
- Runner-up: Kevin Kline – A Fish Called Wanda
- Best Supporting Actress:
  - Joan Cusack – Married to the Mob, Stars and Bars and Working Girl
- Runner-up: Frances McDormand – Mississippi Burning
- Best Director:
  - Stephen Frears – Dangerous Liaisons
- Runner-up: Martin Scorsese – The Last Temptation of Christ
- Best Screenplay:
  - Ron Shelton – Bull Durham
- Best Cinematography:
  - Sven Nykvist – The Unbearable Lightness of Being
- Best Documentary:
  - The Thin Blue Line
- Best Foreign-Language Film:
  - Salaam Bombay! • UK/India/France
