= First Born (TV serial) =

1988 British TV science fiction serial

- Genre: Science fiction
- Created by: Maureen Duffy
- Based on: Gor Saga
- Written by: Ted Whitehead
- Directed by: Philip Saville
- Starring: Charles Dance; Julie Peasgood; Philip Madoc
- Theme music composer: Hans Zimmer
- Country of origin: Britain
- Original language: English
- No. of seasons: 1
- No. of episodes: 3

Production
- Producer: Sally Head
- Running time: 150 minutes

First Born is a British science fiction television serial produced by the BBC in 1988 and directed by Philip Saville. Other notable cast members included Charles Dance, Jamie Foster, Julie Peasgood, Gabrielle Anwar, Philip Madoc, Sharon Duce and Roshan Seth.

== Premise ==
Charles Dance starred as genetic researcher Edward Forester, whose work leads him to create a man-gorilla hybrid, using sperm from an unknown sperm donor and cells taken from a female gorilla. He then raises the baby as his own son, only to find that there are horrifying consequences for playing God.

== Plot Summary ==
Edward Forester (Charles Dance) is a researcher at a government-run institute which aims to create hybrid animals. Although nominally attempting to produce an orangutan-gorilla hybrid, Forester is in fact trying to produce a human-gorilla hybrid, something known only to him and his superior, Colonel Lancing (Philip Madoc). Unbeknownst even to Lancing, Forester uses sperm he has donated for the experiments. After multiple failed attempts, a female gorilla named Mary is successfully inseminated and carries the pregnancy to term. The child, designated H07, but nicknamed Gordon, or "Gor" for short, survives and thrives, defying all expectations.

After his mother Mary rejects him, Forester realizes that Gor cannot stay at the institute. Forester's colleague Chris Knott (Peter Tilbury) agrees to foster him with his wife Nancy (Rosemary McHale) as they are unable to have children of their own. However, Chris becomes increasingly suspicious as Gor ages. His body hair begins to fall out and he does not exhibit the typical physical traits of a gorilla or orangutan. Outwardly, he appears entirely human, leading Chris to suspect that Gor was accidentally substituted with one of the human infants kept at the institute for comparison.

Meanwhile, Lancing informs Forester that the government has ordered the institute to cease all hybrid research and terminate all embryos, including Gor. Unwilling to do this, Forester falsifies the termination report, and Gor continues to live with Chris and Nancy. When Chris confronts Forester about Gor's true origins, Forester admits that while Gor is Mary's son, he is a human-gorilla hybrid. Upon learning this, Chris decides that Gor can no longer live with him and Nancy, and hands him over to Forester in the night while Nancy is sleeping. Forester puts Gor's basket in a river, intending for the currents to carry him away, but after hearing Nancy's cries of anguish when she awakes and discovers the infant gone, Forester rescues him, and takes him to a farmer named Jessop (Niven Boyd) who cares for some of the institute's other animals. After discovering that Jessop is neglecting him, Forester arranges for Gor to be taken in by Jessop's sister Emily (Sharon Duce).

Five years later, Forester continues to check in on Gor, who remains healthy, but lacks the capacity for speech as his vocal cords are fused like those of a Gorilla. After undergoing experimental surgery and speech therapy in Switzerland, Gor is able to speak normally and is adopted by Forester, much to the consternation of his wife Anne (Julie Peasgood), who doubts Forester's story that the boy's parents were killed in a car crash.

Jessop, upon seeing a photograph of Gor with the Forester family in the newspaper, deduces that it is the same child Forester brought to him five years ago. He kidnaps Gor, intending to use him to blackmail and extort Forester. When Forester arrives at Jessop's farm to retrieve Gor, he and Jessop fight, causing a fire to break out in the farmhouse. Nevertheless, Forester is able to rescue Gor as the farmhouse burns to the ground.

Years pass and Gor continues to live with Forester and his family. Now nearly eighteen, he enrolls at military academy, but while he excels at the physical tests, he finds that he lacks the necessary aggression to become a soldier, and expresses an interest in entering the priesthood.

Unaware that she is his biological half sister, Gor becomes attracted to Forester's teenage daughter Nell (Gabrielle Anwar) who offers to arrange a party at the family home to celebrate Gor turning eighteen. Forester agrees, but becomes enraged when he returns home and finds Gor and Nell asleep in each other's arms. He demands that Gor leave for the abbey to begin his training for the priesthood immediately, but Gor says that he is having doubts about the priesthood due to his feelings for Nell. At this point, Forester tells him that he cannot have children due to a genetic defect from his parents that could be passed onto his offspring, although he does not reveal the true nature of Gor's parentage. He reiterates that Gor must enter the priesthood, but agrees to him starting the next week as originally planned.

The next morning, after Forester leaves the house, Gor sneaks into his study and discovers an album of photographs from his childhood, including one of him with Chris and Nancy as an infant. He meets with Nancy, now elderly and widowed, who tells him that she believes he was substituted with a hybrid baby from the institute. After discovering a notebook at Nancy's house detailing his early life, Gor meets with Lancing, who is terminally ill. Lancing reveals that the institute was engaged in research to produce a human-gorilla hybrid and though Lancing insists that the only successful hybrid was terminated, Gor realizes the truth about his parentage.

Breaking into the institute, Gor confronts Forester, who says that he has destroyed all records of Gor's birth, save for a single floppy disk, but Gor remains distraught and only becomes more so when he learns that Forester is his biological father and that Nell is his sister. Gor is taken to meet Mary, but after insisting that he enters her cage, she beats him to death as Forester watches in horror.

Months later, Nell gives birth to a baby boy. When the priest pours water on the baby's head at his Christening, the baby makes the same vocalizations Gor did before he gained the ability to speak, leading a horrified Forester to realize that the baby is Gor's son — another hybrid.

== Critical reception ==
Science fiction historian Brian Stableford gave First Born a negative review. Stableford described the programme as a "knee-jerk hymn of hate against scientists in general" and "a kind of dumbed-down Doomwatch episode expanded to three times its natural length".

== Production ==
A portion of filming took place in and around the North Wiltshire area, with the Forester family home scenes having been filmed on location in Calne. Woodland scenes from Episode 2 were primarily filmed on location at Savernake Forest near Marlborough, but were subsequently mixed with footage filmed on location in Switzerland. Longleat Safari Park was also used in filming as the setting for the kidnap scenes at the end of Episode 2.

The three-part serial was written by Ted Whitehead and adapted from the novel Gor Saga by Maureen Duffy. It was produced by Sally Head and directed by Philip Saville. The theme tune was composed by Hans Zimmer.

2entertain Ltd released the serial on Region 2 DVD in the UK on 17 July 2006.

== See also ==
- Humanzee
- Chimera (British TV series)
