= From Other Worlds (film) =

2004 American film

- DVD cover
- Directed by: Barry Strugatz
- Screenplay by: Barry Strugatz
- Produced by: Linda Moran; Rene Bastian; Diana E. Williams
- Starring: Cara Buono; Isaach de Bankolé; David Lansbury; Robert Peters; Melissa Leo; Joel de la Fuente
- Cinematography: Mo Flam
- Edited by: Joel Hirsch
- Music by: Pierre Foldes
- Distributed by: Belladonna Prods.
- Release date: 2004
- Running time: 88 minutes
- Country: United States
- Language: English

From Other Worlds is a 2004 American science fiction comedy film written and directed by Barry Strugatz and starring Cara Buono, Isaach de Bankolé, David Lansbury, Robert Peters, Melissa Leo and Joel de la Fuente.

== Cast ==
- Cara Buono as Joanne Schwartzbaum
- Isaach de Bankolé as Abraham
- Melissa Leo as Miriam
- Joel de la Fuente as Alien
- David Lansbury as Brian Schwartzbaum
- Robert Peters as Steve
- Paul Lazar as Larry
- Laurie Esterman as Psychiatrist
- Robert Downey Sr. as Baker
- Jason Oakerson as Big Lab Assistant

== Reception ==
On the review aggregator website Rotten Tomatoes, 38% of 13 critics' reviews are positive. Metacritic, which uses a weighted average, assigned the film a score of 43 out of 100, based on 7 critics, indicating "mixed or average" reviews.

Robert Koehler of Variety gave the film a positive review, calling it an "amiable and arch comedy". Nick Schager of Slant Magazine awarded the film one and a half stars out of four, and wrote, "The film is an awkward mix of comedy, romance, and out-there fantasy. (...) Too bad the story’s humorous bits are so sluggish and off-key".

Scott Tobias of The A.V. Club graded the film a C+, and stated it in the conclusion of his review that "without [Cara] Buono's infectious turn—and perhaps also the one from that alien who impersonates Marlon Brando—From Other Worlds would simply float off into the ether. Even with her, it's often a sickly sweet confection."
