= Furlough (film) =

- Theatrical release poster
- Directed by: Laurie Collyer
- Written by: Barry Strugatz
- Produced by: Jen Gatien; Melissa Leo
- Starring: Tessa Thompson; Melissa Leo; Whoopi Goldberg; Anna Paquin
- Cinematography: Berenice Eveno
- Edited by: Jesse Gordon
- Music by: Jeff Cardoni
- Production companies: EFC Films; Furlough Productions
- Distributed by: IFC Films
- Release date: March 16, 2018
- Running time: 83 minutes
- Country: United States
- Language: English

Furlough is a 2018 American comedy-drama film starring Tessa Thompson, Melissa Leo, Whoopi Goldberg and Anna Paquin. The film was directed by Laurie Collyer, written by Barry Strugatz and produced by Leo; James Schamus served as an executive producer.

== Plot ==
A young woman works part time at a prison while also caring for her mother. The rookie guard gets a chance to prove her mettle when she's tasked with accompanying a hellraising inmate on an emergency furlough to visit her dying mother. But things soon spiral out of control, sending the pair on a surprisingly touching road trip.

== Cast ==
- Tessa Thompson as Nicole Stevens
- Melissa Leo as Joan Anderson
- Whoopi Goldberg as Mrs. Stevens
- Anna Paquin as Lily Benson
- Édgar Ramírez as Kevin Rivera
- La La Anthony as Brandy
- Erik Griffin as Warden Borden
- Drena De Niro as Linda

== Reception ==
On the review aggregator website Rotten Tomatoes, 20% of 5 critics' reviews are positive.

On The Hollywood Reporter, Frank Scheck wrote that the film is "a waste of talent (...) it does so via a sitcom-style sensibility that is not only unfunny but also ruins the film’s sporadic attempts at emotion."
