= The Mayor of Casterbridge (2003 film) =

2002 British TV drama series

- Based on: The Mayor of Casterbridge by Thomas Hardy
- Screenplay by: Ted Whitehead
- Directed by: David Thacker
- Starring: Ciarán Hinds; Juliet Aubrey; Jodhi May
- Composer: Adrian Johnston
- Country of origin: United Kingdom
- Original language: English
- No. of episodes: 2

Production
- Producer: Georgina Lowe
- Cinematography: Ivan Strasburg
- Editor: St. John O'Rorke
- Running time: 194 minutes
- Production companies: LWT; Sally Head Productions

Original release
- Network: ITV
- Release: 28 December – 29 December 2003

The Mayor of Casterbridge is a British television film, produced by Georgina Lowe for Sally Head Productions and directed by David Thacker, based on the 1886 novel by Thomas Hardy. Appearing in the film are Ciarán Hinds as Henchard, Juliet Aubrey as Susan Henchard, Jodhi May as Elizabeth Jane, James Purefoy as Farfrae, and Polly Walker as Lucetta. The film was shown in two parts on 28 and 29 December 2003 on ITV.

== Plot ==
As in the original story, Michael Henchard, in a drunken moment, auctions his wife Susan and their infant child to a passing seaman. Years later, Susan meets up with an apparently contrite Henchard, but he subsequently reverts to his original stubborn and unyielding character. In this version of the story, Henchard appears to be aware of his defects of character but, in the end, is unable to get past them because the traditional social tool of forgiveness constantly eludes him.

Occasionally, as in the characters of Elizabeth Jane and Farfrae, forgiveness is found repeatedly and life recovers. However, in so many other cases throughout this film, enmity prevails and disaster follows. Henchard, the Mayor of Casterbridge, is presented as a selfish, atheistic, personality, and his atheistic tendencies are not shown in any positive light. Even though his character is deeply flawed, Henchard does evoke considerable sympathy because his salvation requires only a change of heart. The pain of his reflexive choices is clearly evident in Ciarán Hinds' presentation of Henchard. Hardy's novel was presented in this version with enormous attention to historical detail. The traditional Christian concerns with love and forgiveness and the consequences of selfish behaviour, are presented with the same emphasis as in the text.

== Partial cast ==
- Ciarán Hinds – Michael Henchard
- Juliet Aubrey – Susan Henchard
- Jodhi May – Elizabeth Jane
- James Purefoy – Farfrae
- Polly Walker – Lucetta Templeman
- Clive Russell – Newson
- David Bradley – Councillor Vatt
- Annette Badland – Mrs Stannidge
- Trevor Peacock – Christopher Coney
- Henry Goodman – Joshua Jopp

== Notable reviews ==
- Angus Wolfe Murray at Eye for Film
- The Victorian Web
- New York magazine
- The Guardian
- Variety
- The New York Times
