= She-Devil (1989 film) =

Film by Susan Seidelman

- Theatrical release poster
- Directed by: Susan Seidelman
- Screenplay by: Barry Strugatz; Mark R. Burns
- Based on: The Life and Loves of a She-Devil by Fay Weldon
- Produced by: Jonathan Brett; Susan Seidelman
- Starring: Meryl Streep; Roseanne Barr; Ed Begley Jr.; Sylvia Miles; Linda Hunt
- Cinematography: Oliver Stapleton
- Edited by: Craig McKay
- Music by: Howard Shore
- Production company: Orion Pictures
- Distributed by: Orion Pictures
- Release date: December 8, 1989
- Running time: 99 minutes
- Country: United States
- Language: English
- Budget: $16 million
- Box office: $15.4 million

She-Devil is a 1989 American comedy film directed by Susan Seidelman, written by Barry Strugatz and Mark R. Burns, and starring Meryl Streep, Roseanne Barr (in her film debut), and Ed Begley Jr. A loose adaptation of the 1983 novel The Life and Loves of a She-Devil by British writer Fay Weldon, She-Devil tells the story of Ruth Patchett, a dumpy, overweight housewife, who exacts devilish revenge after her philandering husband leaves her and their children for glamorous, best-selling romance novelist Mary Fisher.

Produced and distributed by Orion Pictures, She-Devil was released on December 8, 1989. It received mixed reviews from critics, and grossed $15.5 million at the U.S. box office. For her performance, Streep earned a Golden Globe Award nomination for Best Actress – Motion Picture Musical or Comedy at the 47th Golden Globe Awards.

== Plot ==
Ruth Patchett is a frumpy, meek housewife devoted to her accountant husband Bob and their children, Nicolette and Andrew. After Bob meets wealthy, narcissistic romance novelist Mary Fisher at a party, the pair begin an intense affair. Ruth quickly realizes what is happening but remains with Bob, believing he will eventually choose her over Mary. His absences and lies eventually push her too far, and during a dinner with his parents, she confronts him after another bout of verbal abuse. Bob ends the marriage, moves in with Mary, and blames Ruth for his actions, calling her a "she-devil".

Furious, Ruth vows revenge and itemizes Bob's assets: his home, family, career, and freedom. She sabotages the house and destroys it in an explosion. Ruth then leaves Nicolette and Andrew at Mary's mansion, telling them she loves them but will not be returning. Using the alias Vesta Rose, she takes a job at the nursing home where Mary's foul-mouthed, estranged mother, Francine, lives. Ruth replaces Francine's sedatives with multivitamins, helping her and the other residents become more energetic. When Nurse Hooper objects that Ruth is breaking the rules, Ruth argues that downtrodden women like them should support one another.

Meanwhile, Mary struggles to write her latest novel as the children disrupt her life with noise, arguments, mess, and the accidental death of her dog. After befriending Francine, Ruth engineers her removal from the nursing home and moves her into Mary's mansion, further straining Mary and Bob's relationship. During a puff piece interview with People, Francine reveals embarrassing details from Mary's past, including the existence of a secret son, undermining her carefully cultivated image. Mary also learns that her latest novel, about a woman with two children and a husband named Bob, has been poorly received by her publisher.

Ruth befriends Hooper, who admits that she has no idea what she wants from life. Ruth deliberately gets herself fired, prompting Hooper to quit and leave with her. Together, they lease and renovate a building and establish an employment agency for overlooked and unwanted women. Ruth plants one of the agency's flyers in Bob's office, leading to the hiring of Olivia Honey, a young, glamorous blonde. Bob begins an affair with Olivia, leaving Mary increasingly lonely and insecure. Ruth encourages Olivia to tell Bob she loves him and, in response, he fires Olivia. Afterwards, a spiteful Olivia reveals that Bob has been stealing from clients and transferring the money to an offshore account. Olivia and Ruth hack Bob's computer, transfer $200,000 from a client into his account, and report the transaction to the Internal Revenue Service, exposing his wider crimes.

Mary suffers a breakdown after her new book flops, she receives photocopies showing Bob groping Olivia, and her maid quits, unable to tolerate Mary's guests any longer. She throws an elegant party for her friends, during which state troopers arrive and arrest Bob.

Bob's lawyer bribes a corrupt judge to secure a favourable verdict and inadvertently reveals to Mary that Bob has been stealing from her as well. Furious, she leaves him and sells her mansion. A woman who found work as a court clerk through Ruth's agency repays her by reassigning Bob's case to an impartial judge. Bob is convicted of embezzlement and sent to prison.

Sixteen months later, a more glamorous and confident Ruth visits Bob in prison with their children. His imprisonment has made him more appreciative of them and more respectful toward Ruth. Mary, meanwhile, relaunches her career as a more mainstream author. At a book signing for her tell-all memoir, she signs a copy for Ruth without recognizing her at first. Outside, Ruth walks away smiling.

== Cast ==
- Roseanne Barr as Ruth Patchett
- Meryl Streep as Mary Fisher
- Ed Begley Jr. as Robert 'Bob' Patchett
- Linda Hunt as Hooper
- Sylvia Miles as Francine Fisher
- Elisebeth Peters as Nicolette Patchett
- Bryan Larkin as Andrew 'Andy' Patchett
- A Martinez as Garcia
- Maria Pitillo as Olivia
- Lori Tan Chinn as Vesta Rose Woman
- Susan Willis as Ute
- Doris Belack as Paula
- Mary Louise Wilson as Mrs. Trumper
- Jack Gilpin as Larry
- Rosanna Carter as Judge Brown
- June Gable as a realtor
- Deborah Rush as a People reporter

== Production ==
=== Casting ===
Roseanne Barr, who had never appeared in a theatrical film at the time, was cast by director Susan Seidelman as Ruth Patchett, as Seidelman felt Barr embodied a "larger than life" persona appropriate to the character.

=== Filming ===
Principal photography of She-Devil began on April 12, 1989 in the New York City metropolitan area. Mary Fisher's mansion is located at 161 Cliff Road, 11777 in Port Jefferson, New York. The house was demolished in 2017; the 30-bedroom estate belonged to Bulgarian operetta singer and actress Nadya Nozharova, also known as Countess Nadya de Navarro Farber, who died in 2014. The home was built in 1870 and was almost 19,000 sq ft (1,800 m^{2}). The countess lived in the home for over 40 years.

Another mansion in Piermont, New York doubled as a retirement home featured in the film. Filming also took place in Manhattan in Times Square, at the Guggenheim Museum, and in New York City's historic South Street Seaport police precinct, the latter of which served as the location for the Vesta Rose Employment Agency. The Patchett home that Ruth blows up was filmed in a neighborhood in Union Township, New Jersey Unknowingly, Seidelman was five months pregnant when making the film.

== Music ==
The film score for She-Devil was composed by Howard Shore. A soundtrack album was released on November 15, 1989 by Mercury Records. Shore's score was later released in a limited edition of 1,000 copies by Music Box Records.

== Release ==
She-Devil had its world premiere at the Ziegfeld Theatre in New York City on December 6, 1989. The proceeds from the premiere screening were donated to the National Endowment for the Arts (NEA) AMMI education program.

=== Home media ===
Orion Home Video released She-Devil on VHS and Betamax on June 28, 1990. MGM Home Entertainment released the film on DVD on October 2, 2001. In 2015, Olive Films released it for the first time on Blu-ray, licensed via Metro-Goldwyn-Mayer and 20th Century Fox.

== Reception ==
=== Box office ===
Orion Pictures released She-Devil in the United States on December 8, 1989. The film earned $3,509,647 during its opening weekend, and went on to gross a total of $15,351,421.

=== Critical response ===
She-Devil received mixed reviews from critics at the time of its release. On the review aggregator website Rotten Tomatoes, 48% of 25 critics' reviews are positive, with an average rating of 4.8/10. Metacritic, which uses a weighted average, assigned the film a score of 45 out of 100, based on 21 critics, indicating "mixed or average" reviews.

Critic Roger Ebert awarded the film three out of four stars, praising Barr and Streep's performances as well as director Seidelman's "touch for off-center humor, the kind that works not because of setups and punch lines, but because of the screwy logic her characters bring to their dilemmas". Variety called the film "a dark and gleeful revenge saga", adding that the casting is "a real coup, with Barr going her everywoman TV persona one better by breaking the big screen heroine mold, and Streep blowing away any notion that she can’t be funny".

Vincent Canby of The New York Times praised Streep's performance, likening it to "a magnificent illusionist at work. Miss Streep dives into this thimble-sized comedy and makes one believe—at least, while she is on the screen—that it is an Olympic-sized swimming pool of wit", but felt that Barr "is unable to rise above her circumstances. To begin with, she is saddled with a role that is less serious, as the film's production notes put it, than monstrous. It has nothing to do with her weight, though the movie is not very kind about that". Peter Rainer of the Los Angeles Times made a similar observation, feeling that Streep's comedic performance outshined that of Barr's.

Seidelman reflected on the film (released the week that she gave birth to her child) in 2024:

With She-Devil, a couple of things happened. The studio was really gung ho about the film—top movie star, top TV star. They wanted to put it out on the same weekend as The War of the Roses, which was also a revenge movie, but it had a male star. Its cast, Michael Douglas, Kathleen Turner, and Danny DeVito, had already been in movies together that had been hits. She-Devil was a domestic comedy with two women, so you’re not going to get the guys rushing out to see it. The casting of our film was not a Hollywood given. It was more like a Hollywood curiosity. So my partner, Jonathan, who I produced the movie with, had gone to the studio and said, “Shouldn’t we check into not putting the movie out on the same day as War of the Roses?” But Hollywood—it’s like a machine. Once they get the trailers out saying “Coming December 18th” and they book three thousand screens, it’s very hard to change dates. I do think that that film did very well in ancillary markets, on DVD and TV, but it would’ve done better if it wasn’t on that weekend. And also, literally the week the movie came out, that week was when I had a baby. So suddenly I’m a mom, and my world is changing drastically.

=== Accolades ===
For her performance, Streep was nominated for a Golden Globe Award for Best Actress – Motion Picture Comedy or Musical at the 47th Golden Globe Awards.

== See also ==
- Sathi Leelavathi (1995) — Tamil remake of this film
