= Enchanted (Marc Almond album) =

Studio album by Marc Almond
- Released: 7 August 1990
- Recorded: Marcus, Beethoven Street, Sarm West, Advision, Mayfair Studios, London.
- Labels: Parlophone, Some Bizzare, Capitol Records
- Producers: Bob Kraushaar, Gary Maughan, Stephen Hague

Marc Almond chronology
Jacques (1989)	Enchanted (1990)	Memorabilia – The Singles (1991)

Singles from Enchanted
- 1. "A Lover Spurned" b/w "Exotica Rose" Released: February 1990; 2. "The Desperate Hours" b/w "The Gambler" Released: May 1990; 3. "Waifs and Strays" b/w "City of Nights" / "Old Jack's Charm" Released: November 1990

Enchanted is the sixth studio album by the British singer/songwriter Marc Almond. It was released on 7 August 1990 and reached number 52 on the UK Albums Chart and number 81 on the Dutch albums chart. Enchanted includes the singles "A Lover Spurned" (a UK Top 30 hit featuring actress Julie T. Wallace), "The Desperate Hours" and "Waifs and Strays" (the latter of which was remixed by The Grid for its release as a single).

== Background ==
The songs for the album were recorded at Marcus, Beethoven Street, Sarm West, Advision, and Mayfair Studios, London. Almond was accompanied by former La Magia and Willing Sinners member Billy McGee, and various studio musicians. Almond worked with three producers, Bob Kraushaar and Gary Maughan oversaw half of the tracks each, while Stephen Hague produced the lead single "A Lover Spurned".

Almond has described the recording process of this album as one of "conflict" between himself and producer Kraushaar. Writing in his autobiography Tainted Life, Almond describes how in the recording he wanted "spontaneity and surprise, passion and grit" and that he "wanted to be the conductor, waving my baton as musicians came in and out, brandishing strange instruments that created exotic sounds", whereas Kraushaar "was a technophile, and would have happily replaced everyone with the passionless dependability of his computer if he could." However, Almond concedes that "A year later I played the album and loved it. Bob Kraushaar had produced a highly polished, wonderful-sounding album, which at the time I just couldn't hear."

The album was reissued on CD in 2002 having been remastered. The artwork was designed by Green Ink with a cover photograph of Almond and Zuleika by Pierre et Gilles. Almond has stated that it is his favourite album cover.

Professional ratings
Review scores
Source	Rating
AllMusic	1.5/5 stars
Encyclopedia of Popular Music	3/5 stars
New Musical Express	7/10

== Track listing ==
All tracks are written by Marc Almond, except as indicated.

Side one
No.	Title	Writer(s)	Length
1.	"Madame De La Luna"	Marc Almond, Billy McGee	4:47
2.	"Waifs and Strays"		5:09
3.	"The Desperate Hours"		4:27
4.	"Toreador in the Rain"		2:52
5.	"Widow Weeds"	Marc Almond, Billy McGee	5:39

Side two
No.	Title	Length
6.	"A Lover Spurned"	5:37
7.	"Deaths Diary"	4:00
8.	"The Sea Still Sings"	3:48
9.	"Carnival of Life"	4:38
10.	"Orpheus in Red Velvet"	5:07

== Personnel ==
=== Players ===
- Marc Almond – vocals, arrangements
- Billy McGee – keyboards, bass guitar, orchestra arrangements, conductor, arrangements, brass arrangement ("Deaths Diary" and "Orpheus in Red Velvet")
- Gary Maughan – Fairlight, additional keyboards, percussion
- Jack Emblow – accordion
- Enrico Tomasso – brass arrangement ("Deaths Diary" and "Orpheus in Red Velvet")
- The False Harmonics String Ensemble – string orchestra

=== Additional players ===
- "Madame De La Luna"
  - Enrico Tomasso – flugelhorn
  - Chris Tombling – soloist, violin
  - Blair Booth – backing vocals
- "Waifs and Strays"
  - Hossam Ramzy – percussion
  - Betsy Cook – backing vocals, keyboards
- "The Desperate Hours"
  - Richard Bissel – French horn
  - Juan Ramirez – flamenco guitar, handclaps
  - Roland Sutherland – flute
  - Linda Taylor – backing vocals
  - Maggie Ryder – backing vocals
  - Suzie O'List – backing vocals
- "Toreador in the Rain"
  - Chris Tombling – soloist, violin
  - Enrico Tomasso – trumpet
- "Widow Weeds"
  - Hossam Ramzy – percussion
  - Bashir Abdelal – flute
  - Kay Garner – backing vocals
  - Betsy Cook – soloist, voice
- "A Lover Spurned"
  - Julie T. Wallace – voice
  - Stephen Hague – keyboards
- "Deaths Diary"
  - Enrico Tomasso – trumpet
  - Clare Torry – backing vocals
  - Kay Garner – backing vocals
  - Stephanie De-Sykes – backing vocals
  - Betsy Cook – keyboards
- "The Sea Still Sings"
  - Dave Gregory – guitar
  - Clare Torry – backing vocals
  - Kay Garner – backing vocals
  - Stephanie De-Sykes – backing vocals
- "Carnival of Life"
  - Marie France – soloist, voice
  - Clare Torry – backing vocals
  - Kay Garner – backing vocals
  - Stephanie De-Sykes – backing vocals
  - Bob Kraushaar – acoustic guitar
- "Orpheus in Red Velvet"
  - Hossam Ramzy – percussion
  - Enrico Tomasso – trumpet
  - Betsy Cook – backing vocals

=== Technical ===
- Bob Kraushaar – Producer (all tracks except "A Lover Spurned")
- Gary Maughan – Producer (all tracks except "The Desperate Hours" and "A Lover Spurned")
- Stephen Hague – Producer ("A Lover Spurned")
- Bob Kraushaar – Mixing (all tracks except "A Lover Spurned")
- Mike "Spike" Drake – Mixing ("A Lover Spurned") and Additional engineering
- Grant Nicholas, Kevin Whyte, Ron Swan, Simon Duff, Simon Gogerly and Steve Fitzmaurice – Assistant Engineer
- Zuleika – Model
- Pierre Et Giles – Cover Photo
- Green Ink – Direct Art

== Covers ==
- The song 'A Lover Spurned' was covered in Cantonese by singer Leon Lai in 1992 on his album 但願不只是朋友 under the name 情歸落泊,
