= Barry Strugatz =

American film director and screenwriter

- Born: United States
- Occupations: Film director, screenwriter

Barry Strugatz is an American film director and screenwriter.

== Personal life ==
Strugatz began working on Hair as a production assistant in 1978. He continued writing several projects, including some with his writing partner Mark R. Burns, with whom he wrote Married to the Mob and She-Devil. Strugatz, a lifetime Brooklynite, currently still resides there with his wife and kids.

== Career ==
Strugatz got his start as a production assistant and location scout, working under the auspices of directors Miloš Forman (Hair) and Woody Allen (The Purple Rose of Cairo). He wrote the screenplay to 1988’s Married to the Mob, directed by Jonathan Demme, but 1989’s She Devil endured a critical and commercial roasting. He finally turned to directing in 2000 with a short film, The Transformation.

=== Married to the Mob ===
Married to the Mob is a 1988 American comedy film directed by Jonathan Demme, starring Michelle Pfeiffer and Matthew Modine.

Pfeiffer gave an acclaimed lead performance as a gangster's widow, and Matthew Modine played an undercover FBI agent assigned the task of investigating her mafia connections.

As a slippery mob boss romantically pursuing Angela, Dean Stockwell was nominated for the Academy Award for Best Supporting Actor. It currently holds a 91% Fresh Rating on Rotten Tomatoes

=== She-Devil ===
She-Devil is a 1989 American film starring Meryl Streep and Roseanne Barr. It was directed by Susan Seidelman, and it is the second adaptation of the novel The Life and Loves of a She-Devil by British writer Fay Weldon. For her role, Streep was nominated for the Best Actress for a Musical or Comedy Golden Globe in 1990.

=== The Transformation ===
This short film stars Paul Lazar as a mailroom employee. He's an adult who faces difficult treatment from several people in his life like co-workers, bosses, bullies, and even his own father. After watching a Steve McQueen movie, he takes insipiration for standing up for himself.

=== From Other Worlds ===
From Other Worlds is a sci-fi comedy about a depressed Brooklyn housewife who sleepwalks through her life until she encounters an alien force in her backyard. With the help of a fellow contactee, an African immigrant, she is determined to solve the mystery of her otherworldly experiences. Along the way, she finds romance, saves the planet and finds new meaning in her life.

== Filmography ==
Film
Year	Title	Contribution	Notes
1988	Married to the Mob	writer	nominated—Academy Award for Best Supporting Actor mominated—Golden Globe Award for Best Actress – Motion Picture Musical or Comedy
1989	She-Devil	writer	nominated—Golden Globe Award for Best Actress – Motion Picture Musical or Comedy
2000	The Transformation (short)	director/writer	Newport International Film Festival for Audience Award; Stony Brook Film Festival for Audience Choice Award
2004	From Other Worlds	director/writer	
2018	Furlough	writer	
