= The Life and Loves of a She-Devil (TV series) =

- Genre: Drama
- Based on: The Life and Loves of a She-Devil by Fay Weldon
- Written by: Ted Whitehead
- Directed by: Philip Saville
- Starring: Dennis Waterman; Patricia Hodge; Julie T. Wallace
- Theme music composer: Peter Filleul
- Country of origin: United Kingdom
- Original language: English
- No. of episodes: 4

Production
- Running time: 60 minutes

Original release
- Network: BBC Two
- Release: 8 October – 29 October 1986

The Life and Loves of a She-Devil is a 1986 British four-part drama serial produced by the BBC and adapted from Fay Weldon's 1983 novel The Life and Loves of a She-Devil. It won four British Academy Television Awards including Best Drama Series.

== Plot ==
The story concerns married couple Ruth and Bobbo, who are on the verge of separating as Bobbo is having an affair with romantic novelist Mary Fisher. After Bobbo leaves Ruth and moves in with Mary, Ruth develops a plan to get her revenge on both of them.

== Cast ==
The cast of the drama includes:

- Dennis Waterman as Bobbo
- Patricia Hodge as Mary Fisher
- Julie T. Wallace as Ruth
- Miriam Margolyes as Nurse Hopkins
- John Bluthal as Angus
- John Rowe as Dr Rohn
- Stephen Greif as Dr Ghengis
- Tom Baker as Father Ferguson
- Bernard Hepton as Judge Bissop

== Production ==
=== Writing ===
The adaptation by Ted Whitehead was faithful to the novel with only minor changes from the book.

=== Locations ===
It was partly shot at the Belle Tout Lighthouse at Beachy Head near Eastbourne in East Sussex.

== Episodes ==
No.	Title	Directed by	Written by	Original release date
1	"Episode 1"	Philip Saville	Ted Whitehead	8 October 1986
Ruth is devastated when she realizes that her husband Bobbo has been cheating on her, and when he finally abandons her, and their two children, she decides that she will do anything to get revenge on Bobbo and his mistress, romantic novelist Mary Fisher.
2	"Episode 2"	Philip Saville	Ted Whitehead	15 October 1986
Ruth takes on a number of different roles and aliases to get her revenge, including starting to study accountancy, and working in a care home with Mary's mother, and having sex with a lot of different men to desensitize herself.
3	"Episode 3"	Philip Saville	Ted Whitehead	22 October 1986
Because Ruth burnt down their family home, Bobbo and Mary have to let Bobbo's two children live with them, which spoils their romantic plans, meanwhile Ruth gets Mary's mother kicked out of her care home, and she moves in to Mary's home as well.
4	"Episode 4"	Philip Saville	Ted Whitehead	29 October 1986
Mary realizes that Ruth is targeting her, and the stress and worry is making her sick, so she turns to a priest for help but she doesn't suspect that the priest is in Ruth's thrall. Meanwhile Ruth gets Bobbo sent to jail, and starts to takes over Mary's life and identity.

== Awards ==
Year	Award	Category	Nominated artist/work	Result
1987	British Academy Television Awards	Best Drama Series	Sally Head, Philip Saville	Won
1987	British Academy Television Awards	Best Actress	Julie T. Wallace	Nominated
1987	British Academy Television Awards	Best Video Lighting	John King	Won
1987	British Academy Television Awards	Best Video Cameraman	Mike Winser, John Hawes	Won
1987	British Academy Television Awards	Best VTR Editor	Malcolm Banthorpe, Dave Jervis	Won
1987	British Academy Television Awards	Best Make Up	Elizabeth Rowell	Nominated
1987	British Academy Television Awards	Best Costume Design	Joyce Mortlock	Nominated
1987	British Academy Television Awards	Best Graphics	Michael Graham-Smith	Nominated
1987	British Academy Television Awards	Best Original Television Music	Peter Filleul	Nominated
1988	CableACE Awards	Writing a Movie or Miniseries	Ted Whitehead	Won
1988	CableACE Awards	Actress in a Movie or Miniseries	Julie T. Wallace	Nominated
1988	CableACE Awards	Make-Up	Elizabeth Rowell	Nominated

Awards
Preceded by Edge of Darkness	British Academy Television Awards; Best Drama Series or Serial; 1987	Succeeded by Tutti Frutti
