= Joan Cusack =

American actress (born 1962)

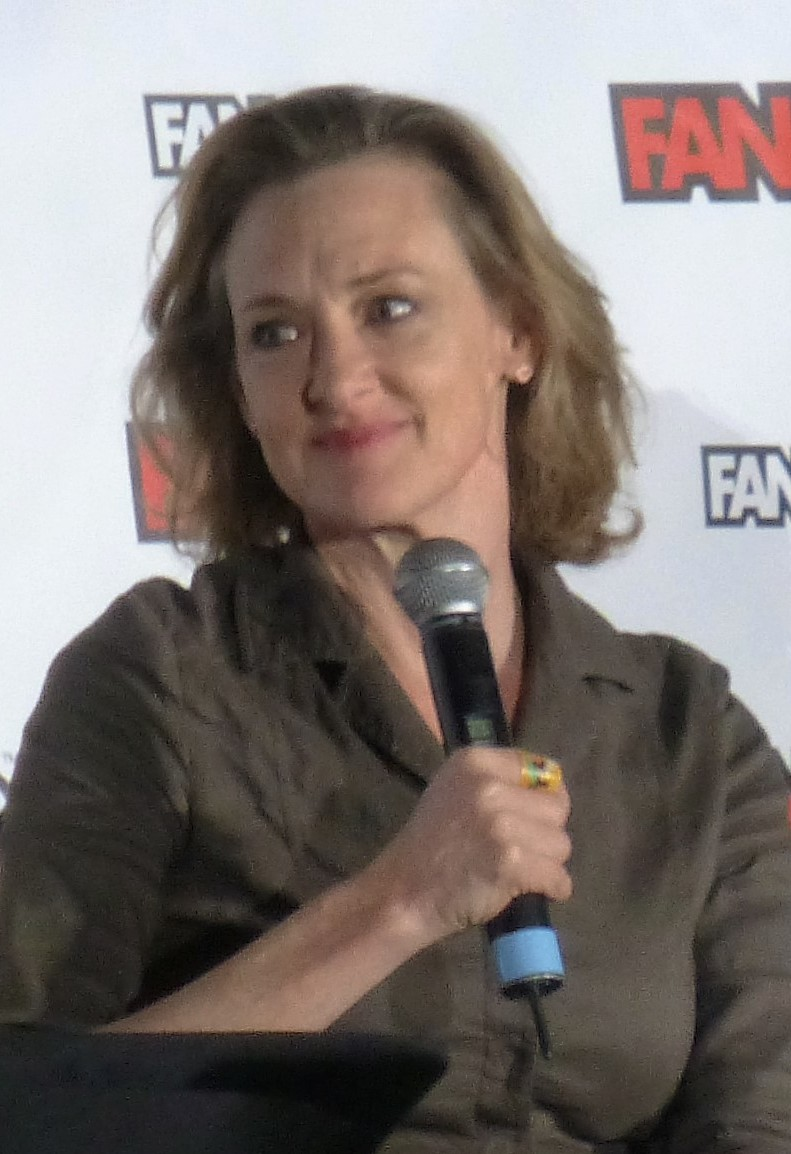
- Cusack in 2016
- Born: Joan Mary Cusack; October 11, 1962 (age 63); New York City, U.S.
- Education: University of Wisconsin–Madison
- Occupation: Actress
- Years active: 1979–present
- Spouse: Richard Burke (m. 1996)
- Children: 2
- Father: Dick Cusack
- Relatives: Ann Cusack (sister); John Cusack (brother)
- Awards: Full list

Joan Mary Cusack (/ˈkjuːsæk/ KEW-sak; born October 11, 1962) is an American actress. She is known for her distinctive voice and offbeat comedic timing, and her portrayals of neurotic, endearing characters have earned her numerous accolades, including a Primetime Emmy Award.

Cusack received nominations for the Academy Award for Best Supporting Actress for her roles in the comedy-drama Working Girl (1988) and the romantic comedy In & Out (1997). Her other starring roles include those in Toys (1992), Addams Family Values (1993), Nine Months (1995), Cradle Will Rock (1999), Where the Heart Is (2000), Looney Tunes: Back in Action (2003), School of Rock (2003), and Kit Kittredge: An American Girl (2008). She has also provided voice roles such as Jessie in the Toy Story franchise (1999–present), for which she won an Annie Award, and Abby Mallard in Chicken Little (2005), as well as the narrator of the children's preschool series Peep and the Big Wide World (2004–2011).

Cusack was a cast member on the comedy sketch show Saturday Night Live from 1985 to 1986. She starred on the Showtime hit drama comedy series Shameless (2011–2015) as Sheila Jackson, a role for which she received five consecutive Primetime Emmy nominations, winning the award in 2015. She is a sister of actress Ann Cusack and actor John Cusack.

== Early life ==
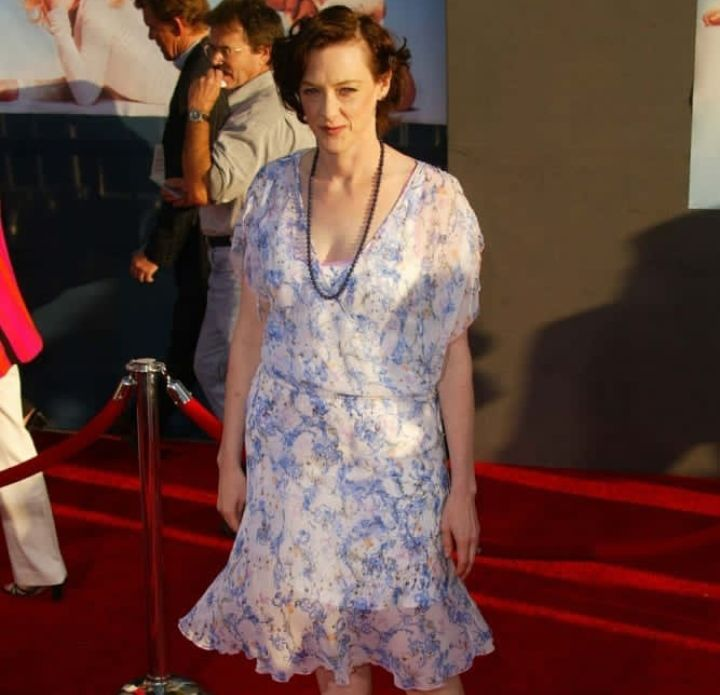
Cusack in 2004

Joan Mary Cusack was born on October 11, 1962, in New York City and was raised in Evanston, Illinois, a suburb of Chicago. Her mother, Ann Paula "Nancy" Cusack (née Carolan; 1929–2022), was a mathematics teacher and political activist. Her father, Dick Cusack (1925–2003), was an actor and filmmaker, and two of her four siblings, Ann and John, are actors. Her Catholic family is of Irish descent. Cusack is an alumna of the University of Wisconsin–Madison (1984), where she earned a bachelor's degree in English.

== Career ==
Cusack has twice been nominated for an Academy Award for Best Supporting Actress, for her work in Working Girl (1988) and In & Out (1997). She has appeared with her brother John in ten movies: Class (1983), Sixteen Candles (1984), Grandview, U.S.A. (1984), Broadcast News (1987), Say Anything... (1989), Grosse Pointe Blank (1997), Cradle Will Rock (1999), High Fidelity (2000), Martian Child (2007), and War, Inc. (2008).

Cusack voiced Jessie in the Pixar hits Toy Story 2 (1999), Toy Story 3 (2010), Toy Story 4 (2019), and Toy Story 5 (2026).

In the film Addams Family Values (1993), she played psychotic serial killer Debbie Jellinsky, who marries and kills rich men. She also starred in the short-lived ABC sitcom What About Joan? in 2001 and the hit film Arlington Road (1999). For many years, Cusack was also the commercial spokeswoman for U.S. Cellular. One of Cusack's best-known roles was the principal of Horace Green Elementary School, Rosalie 'Roz' Mullins, in School of Rock (2003). She played Dr. Burton, the therapist of Charlie (Logan Lerman), in the teen film The Perks of Being a Wallflower (2012). She also played Erin's mom in the final episode of NBC's The Office.

Cusack was a cast member on the NBC sketch show Saturday Night Live in its eleventh season (1985–86) with fellow cast members and future stars such as Robert Downey Jr., Damon Wayans, and Anthony Michael Hall. Her recurring characters on SNL included Salena, a socially inept girl who tries to ask out her boyfriend, Biff (played by Jon Lovitz), who is also socially inept. In addition, she did celebrity impersonations of Brooke Shields, Jane Fonda, and Queen Elizabeth II.

She has been nominated four times for the American Comedy Award in the category of Funniest Supporting Actress in a Motion Picture and has won three times, for Runaway Bride (1999), In & Out (1997), and Working Girl (1988). She has also won the New York Film Critics Circle Award and the Broadcast Film Critics Association Award for Best Supporting Actress for In & Out.

Cusack narrates the public-TV animated series Peep and the Big Wide World. In September 2010, Cusack guest-starred on NBC's Law & Order: SVU.

She also appeared as Justice Strauss in Netflix's adaptation of A Series of Unfortunate Events, which premiered in 2017.

Cusack also appeared as the Tin Foil Lady in the Netflix movie Let It Snow, which was released in November 2019.

=== Shameless ===
In 2010, Cusack joined the Showtime drama/comedy Shameless as Sheila Jackson, the mother of Karen Jackson (Laura Slade Wiggins). The first season premiered on January 9, 2011, and had its first finale March 27, 2011. Cusack replaced actress Allison Janney, who portrayed the role in the first edit of the pilot episode. Janney took the role with the understanding the character would be less prominent on the show, but when producers decided to increase the character's screen presence, she was forced to pull out of the part to honor her series commitment on the ABC comedy Mr. Sunshine. Cusack has received critical acclaim for her performance, receiving Primetime Emmy Award for Outstanding Guest Actress in a Drama Series nominations in 2011, 2012, and 2013, as well as a nomination for the Primetime Emmy Award for Outstanding Guest Actress in a Comedy Series in 2014 and 2015, winning in the latter year.

== Personal life ==
Cusack married attorney Richard Burke in 1996. They have two sons. Cusack owns a home in Three Oaks Township, Michigan, and lives in Chicago, Illinois.

Since 2011, Cusack has owned Judy Maxwell Home, a gift shop in Old Town, Chicago. The shop is named after Barbra Streisand's character in What's Up Doc? (1972), Cusack's favorite movie.

== Filmography ==
=== Film ===
Year	Title	Role	Notes
1980	Cutting Loose		
1980	My Bodyguard	Shelley	
1983	Class	Julia	
1984	Sixteen Candles	Geek Girl #1	
1984	All Together Now	Linda Parker	
1984	Grandview, U.S.A.	Mary Maine	
1987	The Allnighter	Gina	
1987	Broadcast News	Blair Litton	
1988	Stars and Bars	Irene Stein	
1988	Married to the Mob	Rose	
1988	Working Girl	Cynthia	
1989	Say Anything...	Constance Dobler	Uncredited
1990	Men Don't Leave	Jody	
1990	My Blue Heaven	Hannah Stubs	
1991	Arrive Alive	Joy	Unfinished film
1991	The Cabinet of Dr. Ramirez	Cathy	Also writer
1992	Hero	Evelyn Laplante	
1992	Toys	Alsatia Zevo	
1993	Addams Family Values	Debbie Jellinsky	
1994	Corrina, Corrina	Jonesy	
1995	Nine Months	Gail Dwyer	
1995	Two Much	Gloria	
1996	Mr. Wrong	Inga Gunther	
1997	Grosse Pointe Blank	Marcella Mayes	
1997	A Smile Like Yours	Nancy Tellen	
1997	In & Out	Emily Montgomery	
1999	Arlington Road	Cheryl Lang	
1999	Cradle Will Rock	Hazel Huffman	
1999	Runaway Bride	Peggy Flemming	
1999	Toy Story 2	Jessie	Voice
2000	High Fidelity	Liz	
2000	Where the Heart Is	Ruth Meyers	
2002	It's a Very Merry Muppet Christmas Movie	Rachel Bitterman	
2003	School of Rock	Rosalie Mullins	
2003	Looney Tunes: Back in Action	Mother	
2004	Raising Helen	Jenny Portman	
2004	The Last Shot	Fanny Nash	Uncredited
2005	Ice Princess	Joan Carlyle	
2005	Chicken Little	Abby Mallard	Voice
2006	Friends with Money	Franny	
2007	Martian Child	Liz Gordon	
2008	War, Inc.	Marsha Dillon	
2008	Kit Kittredge: An American Girl	Miss Lucinda Bond	
2009	Confessions of a Shopaholic	Jane Bloomwood	
2009	Toys in the Attic	Madam Curie	Voice; English dub
2009	My Sister's Keeper	Judge De Salvo	
2009	Acceptance	Nina Rockefeller	
2010	Toy Story 3	Jessie	Voice
2011	Hoodwinked Too! Hood vs. Evil	Verushka	Voice
2011	Mars Needs Moms	Milo's Mom	Voice; Also motion-capture
2011	Hawaiian Vacation	Jessie	Voice; Short film
2011	Small Fry	Jessie	Voice; Short film
2011	Arthur Christmas	Mission Control Elf	Voice
2012	Partysaurus Rex	Jessie	Voice; Short film
2012	The Perks of Being a Wallflower	Dr. Burton	
2014	Welcome to Me	Dawn Hurley	
2015	The End of the Tour	Patty Gunderson	
2015	Freaks of Nature	Peg Parker	
2016	Popstar: Never Stop Never Stopping	Tilly Friel	
2017	Snatched	Barb	
2017	Unicorn Store	Gladys	
2017	The Christmas Train	Agnes	
2018	Instant Family	Mrs. Howard	
2019	Toy Story 4	Jessie	Voice
2019	Let It Snow	Mysterious Tin Foil Woman	
2019	Klaus	Mrs. Tammy Krum	Voice
2026	Toy Story 5	Jessie	Voice

=== Television ===
Year	Title	Role	Notes
1985–1986	Saturday Night Live	Various Characters	17 episodes
1994	Great Performances	The Daughter	Episode: "The Mother"
2000	Sesame Street	Herself	1 episode
2000	72nd Academy Awards	Jessie	Voice; Television special
2001–2002	What About Joan?	Joan Gallagher	Lead role
2004–2011	Peep and the Big Wide World	Narrator	Voice; Main role
2010	Law & Order: Special Victims Unit	Pamela Burton	Episode: "Locum"
2011–2015	Shameless	Sheila Jackson	Recurring role (seasons 1–5)
2011	Phineas and Ferb	Glenda Wilkins	Voice; Episode: "Last Train to Bustville"
2013	The Office	Erin's Biological Mother	Episode: "Finale"
2013	Toy Story of Terror!	Jessie	Voice; Television special
2014	Toy Story That Time Forgot	Jessie	Voice; Television special
2016–2019	The Stinky & Dirty Show	Red	Voice; 8 episodes
2017, 2019	A Series of Unfortunate Events	Justice Strauss	4 episodes
2020	Homecoming	Francine Bunda	3 episodes

=== Stage ===
Year	Title	Role	Notes
1988	Road	Louise/Clare	La MaMa Experimental Theatre Club, Off-Broadway
1989	Brilliant Traces	Rosannah DeLuce	Cherry Lane Theatre, Off-Broadway
1989	Cymbeline	Imogen	The Public Theater, Off-Broadway
1990	'Tis Pity She's A Whore	Putana	Goodman Theatre
1991	A Midsummer Night's Dream	Helena	Goodman Theatre
2003	The Guys	The Writer	Lakeshore Theatre

=== Video games ===
Year	Title	Voice role	Notes
1999	Toy Story 2: Buzz Lightyear to the Rescue	Jessie	
2005	Chicken Little	Abby Mallard	Archive recordings
2006	Chicken Little: Ace in Action	Abby Mallard	
2010	Toy Story 3: The Video Game	Jessie	
2011	Kinect: Disneyland Adventures	Jessie	
2012	Kinect Rush: A Disney–Pixar Adventure	Jessie	
2016	Disney Magic Kingdoms	Jessie	Initial release; voice lines were later removed in an update
2023	Disney Speedstorm	Jessie	
