= Married to the Mob =

1988 American film directed by Jonathan Demme

- Theatrical release poster
- Directed by: Jonathan Demme
- Written by: Barry Strugatz; Mark R. Burns
- Produced by: Kenneth Utt; Edward Saxon
- Starring: Michelle Pfeiffer; Matthew Modine; Dean Stockwell; Mercedes Ruehl; Alec Baldwin
- Cinematography: Tak Fujimoto
- Edited by: Craig McKay
- Music by: David Byrne
- Production company: Orion Pictures; Mysterious Arts
- Distributed by: Orion Pictures
- Release date: August 19, 1988
- Running time: 104 minutes
- Country: United States
- Language: English
- Budget: $10 million
- Box office: $21.4 million

Married to the Mob is a 1988 American crime romantic comedy film directed by Jonathan Demme, written by Barry Strugatz and Mark R. Burns, and starring Michelle Pfeiffer, Matthew Modine, Dean Stockwell, Mercedes Ruehl, and Alec Baldwin. Pfeiffer plays Angela de Marco, a gangster's widow from Long Island, opposite Modine as the undercover FBI agent assigned the task of investigating her mafia connections.

The film was released on August 19, 1988, by Orion Pictures. It earned positive reviews from critics and earned several accolades; Pfeiffer was nominated for a Golden Globe Award for Best Actress – Motion Picture Comedy or Musical, and Stockwell was nominated for an Academy Award for Best Supporting Actor.

Demme called it "a complete escapist fantasy... fun to do, and very cathartic, revivifying."

== Plot ==
Angela de Marco is the beleaguered housewife of "Cucumber" Frank de Marco, an up-and-comer in the Long Island mob. She is fed up with her husband's criminal lifestyle, and annoyed by the other mob wives. During an argument with Frank, she demands a divorce, but is quickly rebuffed.

Soon after, Frank is violently dispatched by his don Tony "The Tiger" Russo, when he is discovered to be also seeing the latter's mistress. Angela wants to escape the criminal underworld with her son, but is harassed by Tony, who puts the moves on her at Frank's funeral. This clinch earns her the suspicion of FBI agents Mike Downey and Ed Benitez, who are conducting surveillance, and also of Tony's wife Connie, who confronts Angela with accusations of stealing her husband.

After Tony lavishes Angela and Joey with gifts, they move to a small apartment on the Lower East Side. He has his people track her down there.

To complicate things, Downey is assigned to monitor Angela's movements as part of an undercover surveillance operation. He follows her around the city as she seeks employment, until he goes to wire her apartment.

Downey, going by Mike Smith, sneaks out of Angela's before she can catch him plant a bug. Angela goes to a hairdresser’s and gets a job. Downey bumps into her in her building, and she asks him out. On Friday night, as they are on their date, Tony narrowly escapes a hit across town.

Connie barges into Angela's looking for Tony but backs off upon finding Downey there. Angela explains to him that she'd tried to break away from the mob but they won't let her. Downey subtly destroys the bugs, as he cannot resist becoming romantically involved with Angela.

In the morning, Downey's partner Ed gets him to leave, and the FBI raids the hairdresser’s. In their offices, Angela discovers that Mike is Agent Downey. After being threatened with prison, Angela agrees to help the FBI catch Tony.

Angela visits Tony, convincing him she's interested, and gets invited with him on a trip to Miami. The jealous Connie follows, while Downey and Ed get on the same flight as Tony and Angela. Tony recognizes Downey in disguise at the hotel, as he's crossed paths with him more than a few times. Tony's henchmen bring him up to the suite, but just before they can do away with him and Angela, Connie bursts into the Miami Beach suite.

After a climactic shootout, Angela punches out Connie and the FBI bursts in. Some time later Tony is convicted for murdering Karen and Frank, while Downey convinces Angela to give him a second chance.

== Cast ==
- Michelle Pfeiffer as Angela de Marco
- Matthew Modine as FBI Agent Mike Downey
- Dean Stockwell as Tony "The Tiger" Russo
- Mercedes Ruehl as Connie Russo
- Alec Baldwin as Frankie "The Cucumber" de Marco
- Trey Wilson as FBI Regional Director Franklin
- Joan Cusack as Rose
- Oliver Platt as FBI Agent Ed Benitez
- Paul Lazar as Tommy
- "Sister" Carol East as Rita "Hello Gorgeous" Harcourt
- Ellen Foley as Theresa
- Chris Isaak as "The Clown"
- O-Lan Jones as Phyllis
- Nancy Travis as Karen Lutnick
- Frank Gio as Nick "The Snake"
- Gary Howard Klar as Al "The Worm"
- Warren Miller as Johnny "King's Roost" King
- Anthony J. Nici as Joey de Marco
- Steve Vignari as Steve "Stevarino"

Other actors in the film include Al Lewis as Uncle Joe Russo, Ralph Corsel as Jimmie "Fisheggs" Roe, Maria Karnilova as Frank's mother, Captain Haggerty as "the Fat Man", the target of Frank's hit aboard the train; and Marlene Willoughby as his wife. Additionally, Demme regulars Obba Babatundé, Tracey Walter, and Charles Napier appear, respectively, as Tony's prison guard (credited as "The Face of Justice"), the owner of the Chicken Lickin' retauraunt, and Angela's hairdresser Ray.

Short cameo appearances include: the film's director, Jonathan Demme, as a man getting off an elevator in Miami; the film's music supervisor, Gary Goetzman, as the guy playing piano when the mobsters gather at the "King's Roost" restaurant; singer David Johansen as the priest at Frank's funeral; and humorist Roy Blount Jr. and filmmaker Todd Solondz as a news reporters.

Joe Spinell filmed a role as mobster Leonard "Tiptoes" Mazilli, which was cut from the final film, though he still appears in a montage of deleted scenes over the end credits.

== Production ==
Demme called the film "a blatant attempt at a full-tilt, crassly commercial entertainment." However he also hoped "that if people liked the picture, part of their experience would be seeing this white person leave their comfortable, suburban, fully equipped home and become an absolute outsider." He added that "the subtle social message" of the movie "is that people of different races especially, and people in general, can benefit by reaching out to other people, and by being reached out to in turn."

=== Casting ===
Demme originally envisioned Jessica Lange and Tom Cruise in the lead roles. He said that Mike Medavoy suggested Michelle Pfeiffer and the director agreed immediately, having worked with her in Into the Night (on which Demme had a cameo). He had a different actor in mind to play Tony but changed his mind after seeing a photo of Dean Stockwell.

Something Wild star Ray Liotta turned down the part of Frank.

=== Filming ===
Filming took place on-location in Long Island and Brooklyn, New York, and in Miami, Florida.

=== Post-production ===
The original cut was over three hours so numerous scenes were taken out. However outtakes from these appear in the end credits.

=== Music ===
The musical score was composed by David Byrne, after Demme directed the Talking Heads concert films Stop Making Sense.

The film features the song "Goodbye Horses" by Q Lazzarus, which Demme would later use in The Silence of the Lambs.

The opening credits use the Rosemary Clooney song "Mambo Italiano," which is not included in the film's official soundtrack.

== Reception ==
=== Critical response ===
Married to the Mob received a largely positive response from critics. On Rotten Tomatoes, the film holds an approval rating of 87% based on 47 reviews, with an average rating of 7.30/10. The site's critics consensus reads: "Buoyed by Jonathan Demme's intuitive direction and Michelle Pfeiffer's irresistible charisma, Married to the Mob is a saucy mix of broad comedy and gangster drama." Metacritic, which uses a weighted average, assigned the film a score of 71 out of 100, based on 15 critics, indicating "generally favorable" reviews.

Janet Maslin of The New York Times wrote that "Married to the Mob works best as a wildly overdecorated screwball farce... it also plays as a gentle romance, and as the story of a woman trying to re-invent her life." The Washington Post described the film as "all decked out in Godfather kitsch, but underneath its loud exterior, a complex heroine struggles for freedom." Variety called the film "fresh, colorful and inventive." Time Out wrote that although the film was "relentlessly shallow, the performances, music and gaudy visuals provide a fizzy vitality for which many other directors would give their right arm." Roger Ebert of the Chicago Sun-Times gave a more lukewarm review, but ended positively: "Still, Married to the Mob is loaded with wonderful offbeat touches... [and] most assuredly doesn't lack soul."

Jonathan Demme's direction was praised for its idiosyncrasy. The New York Times called him "American cinema's king of amusing artifacts: blinding bric-a-brac, the junkiest of jewelry, costumes so frightening they take your breath away." The Washington Post wrote that Demme "has nailed one with this playful, but dangerous, gangster farce."

The acting performances were widely acclaimed, especially that of Michelle Pfeiffer in a star-making turn, "her best performance to date." Richard Corliss of Time wrote that Pfeiffer was the "emotional anchor to his [Demme's] vertiginous sight gags." Variety claimed the "enormous cast is a total delight, starting with Pfeiffer." The Washington Post called Pfeiffer a "deft comedian... It's her movie, and she graces it." Matthew Modine was "winning", according to Variety.

Supporting players Dean Stockwell and Mercedes Ruehl also received praise for their performances. The Washington Post described Ruehl's character as "majestic in her jealousy, stealing scenes but never the show from the sweetly determined Pfeiffer." Maslin of The New York Times found that Pfeiffer and Modine were "readily upstaged by Miss Ruehl and, especially, by Mr. Stockwell. His shoulder-rolling caricature of this suave, foppish and thoroughly henpecked kingpin is the film's biggest treat." Variety described Stockwell as "a hoot."

=== Awards and nominations ===
Award	Category	Nominee(s)	Result	Ref.
Academy Awards	Best Supporting Actor	Dean Stockwell	Nominated	
Artios Awards	Outstanding Achievement in Feature Film Casting – Comedy	Howard Feuer	Nominated	
Boston Society of Film Critics Awards	Best Supporting Actor	Dean Stockwell (also for Tucker: The Man and His Dream)	Won	
Boston Society of Film Critics Awards	Best Supporting Actress	Joan Cusack (also for Stars and Bars and Working Girl)	Won	
Chicago Film Critics Association Awards	Best Supporting Actor	Dean Stockwell	Nominated	
Golden Globe Awards	Best Actress in a Motion Picture – Musical or Comedy	Michelle Pfeiffer	Nominated	
Kansas City Film Critics Circle Awards	Best Supporting Actor	Dean Stockwell	Won (Note: Tied with Tom Cruise for Rain Man and Martin Landau for Tucker: The Man and His Dream.)	
National Society of Film Critics Awards	Best Supporting Actor	Dean Stockwell (also for Tucker: The Man and His Dream)	Won	
National Society of Film Critics Awards	Best Supporting Actress	Mercedes Ruehl	Won	
New York Film Critics Circle Awards	Best Supporting Actor	Dean Stockwell (also for Tucker: The Man and His Dream)	Won	
Young Artist Awards	Best Young Performer in a TV Movie, Pilot or Special	Cory Danziger	Nominated	
