= Philip Saville =

British screenwriter (1930–2016)

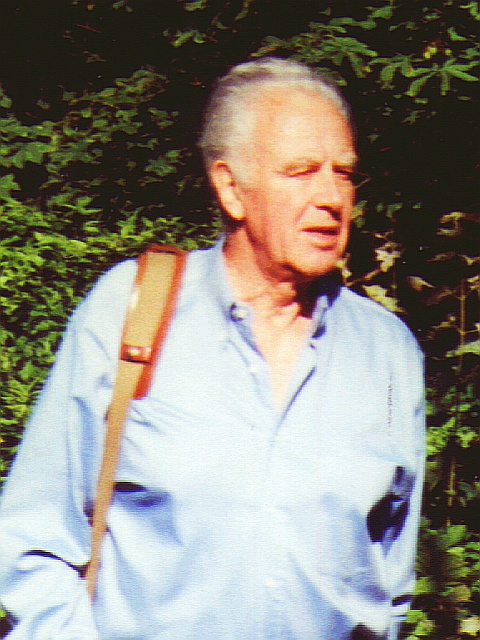
- Saville in 2001
- Born: Philip Saffer; 28 October 1927; London, England
- Died: 22 December 2016 (aged 89); Hampstead, London, England
- Other name: Philip Savile
- Education: University of London; Royal Academy of Dramatic Art
- Occupations: Director, screenwriter, actor
- Spouses: Jane Arden (m. 1947; died 1982) Nina Zuckerman (m. 1987)
- Partner: Pauline Boty; Diana Rigg
- Children: 4

Philip Saville (born Philip Saffer; 28 October 1927 – 22 December 2016) was an English television and film director, screenwriter and actor whose career lasted half a century.

His work included 45 contributions to Armchair Theatre (1956–72), and he won two BAFTA Awards for Best Drama Series, for Boys from the Blackstuff (1982) and The Life and Loves of a She-Devil (1986). The British Film Institute's Screenonline website described Saville as "one of Britain's most prolific and pioneering television and film directors".

== Early life ==
Saville was born Philip Saffer on 28 October 1927 at Marylebone, London (in later life he gave his birth year as 1930, a date repeated in all his obituaries), son of Louis Saffer (who later assumed the anglicized form of the family name, "Saville", chosen by his father, Joseph Saffer, a master tailor), a travelling salesman for a clothing company, and Sadie Kathleen (known as "Kay"), née Tanenberg, supervisor of Fortnum & Mason's women's fashion department at Piccadilly.

He studied science at London University and trained at the Royal Academy of Dramatic Art (RADA). His National Service in the Royal Corps of Signals was ended by his discharge after he sustained a serious knee injury involving an armoured vehicle.

== Career ==
From the 1950s, Saville worked in television as a director working on plays such as Harold Pinter's A Night Out (1960) for ABC's Armchair Theatre anthology series. He directed over 40 plays for Armchair Theatre and helped pioneer the innovative visual style it became known for, including rapid and intricate camera movements during the often live productions. The critic John Russell Taylor, however, wrote that Saville had submerged the romance "Duel for Love" (Armchair Theatre, 1961) "under intricate camerawork of exquisite beauty and complete irrelevance".

Saville also directed Madhouse on Castle Street (1963) for the BBC, an example "of his interest in psychological states and subjective viewpoints", according to Oliver Wake. The (now lost) production was the first acting appearance of the music star Bob Dylan, whom Saville had flown over specifically to take part in the play. Saville's production of Hamlet at Elsinore (1964) for the BBC pioneered the use of videotape for location recording. An anonymous reviewer in The Times wrote that Saville "while creating handsome pictures, did not allow the setting to distract him from the business of the play". He also worked on an episode of Out of the Unknown, a version of the E.M. Forster short story "The Machine Stops" (1966) in this period. This won the main prize at the 1967 Trieste international science fiction film festival.

=== Later career ===
Saville's significant later work includes Gangsters (1975), Boys from the Blackstuff (1982) and The Life and Loves of a She-Devil (1986), which both won BAFTAs for Best Drama Series. These were both recorded using the OB techniques he pioneered on Hamlet at Elsinore.

For the cinema, Saville directed The Fruit Machine (1988, released as Wonderland in the US), Metroland (1997) and The Gospel of John (2003).

He also directed a masterclass studio in London specialising in dramatic improvisation. Saville's documentary on Harold Pinter Pinter's Progress (2009) for Sundance international television channels and UK's Sky Arts features numerous interviews with associates of the Nobel Prize–winning playwright.

== Personal life ==
Saville was married to the actress, film and theatre director Jane Arden from 1947. The couple had two sons, but separated in the mid-1960s without divorcing. Jane Arden committed suicide in 1982. Saville had an affair with actress and leading British pop artist Pauline Boty whom he met during her student days and who later worked for him and with whom he had a daughter. The affair is said to have inspired the film Darling. He also had an eight-year relationship with actress Diana Rigg during the same period.

From the 1960s he lived in the former home of the artist Augustus John in St John's Wood, London. In 1987 Philip Saville married his second wife, Nina Francis (née Zuckerman) and they had a son together.

=== Death ===
Saville died in Hampstead, London on 22 December 2016, at the age of 89.

== Filmography ==
=== Actor ===
- 1948 A Piece of Cake
- 1948 To the Public Danger (man watching billiards game)
- 1948 Penny and the Pownall Case (actor: Police Car Driver)
- 1953 Murder at 3am (actor: Edward/Jim King)
- 1953 The Straw Man (actor: Link Hunter)
- 1954 Bang! You're Dead (actor: Ben Jones)
- 1954 The Night of the Full Moon (actor: Dale Merritt)
- 1955 Contraband Spain (actor: Martin Scott)
- 1957 The Great Van Robbery (actor: Carter)
- 1957 The Betrayal (actor: Bartel)
- 1958 On the Run (actor: Driscol)
- 1958 Three Crooked Men (actor: Seppy)
- 1959 An Honourable Murder (actor: Mark Anthony)

=== Director ===
- 1960 Armchair Theatre: A Night Out (television)
- 1962 Armchair Theatre: Afternoon of a Nymph (television)
- 1964 Hamlet at Elsinore (television), (director)
- 1964 The Wednesday Play: In Camera (television), (director/adaptation) — based on Jean-Paul Sartre's No Exit
- 1966 Stop the World, I Want to Get Off (director) — based on the musical Stop the World – I Want to Get Off
- 1968 Oedipus the King (director/screenwriter)
- 1969 The Best House in London, (director)
- 1971 Secrets (director/screenwriter)
- 1975 Gangsters (director)
- 1977 Count Dracula (director)
- 1979 Sam's Song (director)
- 1983 Those Glory Glory Days (director)
- 1985 Shadey (director)
- 1986 The Life and Loves of a She-Devil (director)
- 1987 Mandela (director)
- 1988 The Fruit Machine (director, US: Wonderland)
- 1988 First Born (TV serial) (director)
- 1989 Fellow Traveler (director)
- 1990 Max and Helen (director)
- 1990 Crash: The Mystery of Flight 1501 (director)
- 1991 Angels (director)
- 1991 The Cloning of Joanna May (director) — based on Fay Weldon's The Cloning of Joanna May
- 1993 Family Pictures (director)
- 1995 The Buccaneers (director, TV miniseries/serial) — based on Edith Wharton's The Buccaneers
- 1997 Metroland (director)
- 1998 Little White Lies (director)
- 2000 My Uncle Silas (director)
- 2002 The Biographer: The Secret Life of Princess Di (director)
- 2003 Hans Christian Andersen: My Life as a Fairytale (director, film made for TV)
- 2003 The Gospel of John (director)
