= Ted Whitehead =

English playwright and television writer

- Born: 3 April 1933; Liverpool, England
- Died: 13 January 2023 (aged 89)
- Occupations: Playwright, television writer

Ted Whitehead (3 April 1933 – 13 January 2023), also known as E. A. Whitehead, was an English playwright and television writer. He wrote for television programs including The Free Frenchman, The Life and Loves of a She-Devil, Cracker, First Born and The Ruth Rendell Mysteries.

In 1972, Whitehead wrote the play Alpha Beta, starring Albert Finney and Rachel Roberts.

Whitehead died on 13 January 2023, at the age of 89.
