= Julie T. Wallace =

Scottish actress

- Born: Julie Therese Keir; 28 May 1961 (age 65); Wimbledon, London, England
- Occupation: Actress
- Years active: 1986–present

Julie Therese Wallace (born 28 May 1961) is an English actress.

== Biography ==
Julie T. Wallace is the daughter of Scottish actor Andrew Keir and Julia Wallace. She is 6 feet 2 inches (188 cm) tall.

Raised in Wales, she adopted her mother's maiden name professionally after attending the Webber Douglas Drama School. She was active in theatre starting in the late 1970s, including a leading role in Edward Bond's The Worlds, directed by Bond, in a youth theatre production.

She made her television debut in the title role in the BBC dramatisation of Fay Weldon's The Life and Loves of a She-Devil (1986). She was nominated for the British Academy Television Award for Best Actress for her performance. She later played Rosika Miklos in the James Bond film The Living Daylights (1987), and starred in The Comic Strip Presents... episodes "Les Dogs" (1990) and "Queen of the Wild Frontier" (1993). In 1996, Wallace was featured as Serpentine in Neil Gaiman's BBC miniseries Neverwhere, and played Major Iceborg in The Fifth Element.

In the 2000s, she continued to make regular film and television appearances in supporting roles, including recurring roles as Mrs Avery from 2000-01 on Last of the Summer Wine and Tony's Mum on Catterick (2004). She appeared in the short film Rita (2008), the 2013 BBC comedy series Big School, and more recently in The Spiritualist (2016).

== Film roles ==
- The Living Daylights (1987) as Rosika Miklos
- Hawks (1988) as Ward Sister
- Mack the Knife (1989) as Coaxer
- The Lunatic (1991) as Inga Schmidt
- Anchoress (1993) as Bertha
- The Fifth Element (1997) as Major Iceborg
- B. Monkey (1998) as Mrs Sturge
- Devil's Harvest (2003) as Mary Henson
- Lighthouse Hill (2004) as Bunny
- Provoked (2006) as Gladys
- Speed Racer (2008) as Truck Driver
- Rita (2008) as Mum
- Cemetery Junction (2010) as Dignified Woman
- Edge (2010) as Linda
- Stag Hunt (2015) as Mary
- The Spiritualist (2016) as Mother

== Television roles ==
- The Life and Loves of a She-Devil (1986) as Ruth, the "She-Devil"
- Don't Wait Up (1986) Berta, Au pair
- French and Saunders (1987) as Herself
- Comic Relief (1988) as Herself
- The Comic Strip Presents (1990) as Groom's Mother
- Selling Hitler (1991) as Edith Lieblang
- Lovejoy (1993) as Mrs Neighbour
- The Comic Strip Presents (1993) as Fiona
- Anchoress (1993) as Bertha
- The South Bank Show (1994) as Herself
- The Detectives (1994) as W.P.C. Sandy Taylor
- Hamish Macbeth (1995) as Alice Robb
- Neverwhere (1996) as Serpentine
- Sharpe's Regiment (1996) as Maggie
- Heartbeat (1993 and 1997) as Betty Sutch
- Looking After Jo Jo (1998) as Billy's mother
- Last of the Summer Wine (2000–2001) as Mrs (Lolly Minerva) Avery
- My Family (2002) as Jocelyn, Dental Assistant
- Doctors (2003) as Barbara Byers
- Spine Chillers (2003 BBC TV series) Episode 2 - Love Gods as Alison
- Catterick (2004) as Tony's Mum
- Bremner, Bird and Fortune (2005) as Sarah Kennedy
- Hotel Babylon (2006) as Helen Merchant
- Casualty (2010 – 1 episode) as Registrar
- Big School (2013) as Pat Carrington, the lab assistant
- Man Down (2015) as Teggun

== Other work ==
Wallace provided the spoken narration for Marc Almond's 1990 single "A Lover Spurned" from the album Enchanted.

She also appeared in the video for the Adrian Belew and David Bowie song "Pretty Pink Rose" from the album Young Lions.
