= The Luck of Ginger Coffey =

The Luck of Ginger Coffey may refer to:

- The Luck of Ginger Coffey (novel), a 1960 novel by Brian Moore
- The Luck of Ginger Coffey (film), a 1964 film directed by Irvin Kershner
