= Zigman =

Zigman is a surname of Yiddish origin and a variant spelling of Siegman. Notable people with the surname include:

- Aaron Zigman (born 1963), American composer, producer, arranger, songwriter, and musician
- Laura Zigman, American novelist and journalist

== See also ==
- Zigmas
