= Alone. (2014 film) =

alone.
- theatrical release one-sheet
- Directed by: Hilbert David; The Morning After Girls
- Produced by: Hilbert David
- Starring: Sacha Lucashenko; Martin B. Sleeman; Alexander White; EJ Hagen; John Brodeur
- Edited by: Hilbert
- Music by: The Morning After Girls
- Production company: Hypnagogia Films
- Release dates: October 9, 2014 (CBGB Music & Film Festival)
- Running time: 14 minutes
- Country: United States
- Language: English

alone. is a 2014 documentary film about the North American tour of the neo-psychedelia band The Morning After Girls, in support of their LP alone. It was produced by Hilbert David, and directed by Hilbert and The Morning After Girls. The film showcases music, images and live performances while recounting a novel experience in travel, as band members narrate collective aspirations and motives.

== Background ==
Founding members Sacha Lucashenko (vocals and guitar) and Martin B. Sleeman (vocals and guitar) relocated The Morning After Girls from Melbourne to New York in 2008, to pursue an American version of the band. The decision to tour during the autumn of 2011 was based as much on the need to support their music, as on a desire to experience the United States. Tour dates were booked for nearly every night, beginning on September 19, through their final performance on October 21. The group played 29 shows altogether, including the Culture Collide Festival and CMJ Music Marathon.

== Production ==
=== Pre-production ===
Lucashenko approached Sleeman and keyboardist Alexander White in early September, with the notion of creating a tour documentary using footage taken of each other. Sleeman was interested in visual media, and White had been documenting video footage of the band since joining in 2008. The idea was that, in being both subjects and photographers, the group could depict their own perspective without interpretation.

=== Filming ===
the morning after girls gathered a combination of high quality professional video, still photographs, and footage shot by audience members and the band themselves on handheld cameras and mobile phones. Production was spontaneous, done without a script or even an outline of what the result might be. Band members were simply instructed to record the sights and sounds which interested them most, in the way which best approximated their own experience.

=== Post-production ===
Lucashenko challenged Hilbert with actualizing the project in November. The two had previously collaborated on the creation of an original score for Hilbert's 2011 film Ikland, which Hilbert had assembled from footage shot in a similarly spontaneous way. Hilbert was tasked with fulfilling the project concept, using material selected by Lucashenko, and subsequently assumed producing responsibilities as he finished the film.

== Reception ==
alone. premiered in New York City on October 9, 2014 as an official selection at the CBGB Music and Film Festival. It was subsequently shown twice on November 7, 2014 as the special selection of the Rumschpringe International Short Film Festival. It premiered in Canada on October 15, 2015 as a part of Toronto's Reel Indie Film Festival, where it was awarded Best Short. Audience reactions were favorable, and the film has been reviewed positively.
