= Cevin Soling =

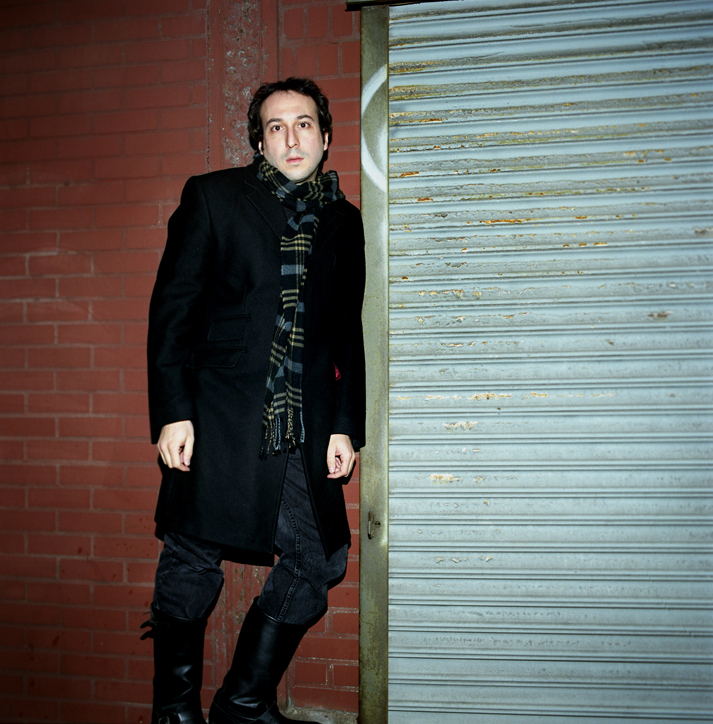

Background information
- Born: Cevin Soling; New York City
- Genres: Alternative rock
- Occupations: Philosopher, music producer, artist, musician, writer, filmmaker
- Instruments: Vocals, guitar
- Years active: 1992–present
- Label: Xemu Records

Cevin Soling is an American writer, filmmaker, philosopher, musician, music producer, and artist.

Soling writes articles and books in addition to producing documentaries, animations, short films, and feature films that engage in social critique. He is president of Spectacle Films and Xemu Records.

Soling produced and directed the well-received documentary The War on Kids, which argues that American schools are failing to educate and that perceptions of the dangers posed by and to children have become distorted. The New York Times described the film as "a shocking chronicle of institutional dysfunction." It was honored as the best educational documentary of its year at the New York Independent Film and Video Festival, and received accolades from Variety and The Huffington Post, among others. He appeared as a guest on The Colbert Report to discuss the film.

Soling's other notable works include the following documentaries and animated shorts: A Hole in the Head, Urine: Good Health, Boris the Dog, The Bill Johnson Show, Great Moments in Rock, and Captain Stickman vs The Color Black.

== Biography ==
Cevin Soling was born in New York Hospital in New York City, and grew up in Scarsdale, New York. His father, Chester Soling, was an architect and real estate developer who founded The Soling Program at Syracuse University.

He attended the University of Michigan, as well as Union College, and ended up majoring in English. He has four graduate degrees from Harvard University. These include degrees from the Harvard Kennedy School, where Soling had a fellowship, and the Harvard Graduate School of Education.

=== Film career ===
Cevin wrote and directed the short animated film Boris the Dog, which aired as part of MTV's Cartoon Sushi in 1998 and later on the BBC. It won the "Premio Nuovo" award at the Williamsburg Brooklyn Film Festival. His short films Captain Stickman and Destruction were selected for the 2006 Chicago Indiefest. The Bill Johnson Show, an animated series written and created by Soling, was featured in Spike and Mike's Sick and Twisted Animation Festival, as well as in its Caught in the Act video compilation distributed by Shout Factory. Soling was executive producer for the animated short Great Moments in Rock.

He was also an executive producer for the 1998 independent feature film Relax...It's Just Sex, which premiered at the Sundance Film Festival and was shown on HBO and Showtime.

Urine: Good Health (1999)

Soling executive produced this hour-long documentary directed by Eli Kabillio about urine therapy. This unconventional and controversial practice, which involves the use of one’s own urine for health benefits, has been employed throughout history by people around the world and is one of the oldest modalities of health care. This documentary explores the claims of the users and proponents of urine therapy and the views of some of the world’s doctors and researchers regarding the medical uses of urine.

The War on the War on Drugs (2005)

Cevin was writer, director, and producer of the film The War on the War on Drugs which won the award for best experimental feature film at the New York International Independent Film and Video Festival in 2005, as well as the High Times Stony Award for best documentary. It also won the "Clear Creek" Honorable Mention Award at the Winslow International Film Festival. The film was acquired for worldwide DVD distribution by The Disinformation Company.

A Hole in the Head (2008)

In 1998, he produced the documentary A Hole in the Head on the history of trepanation. It was broadcast on The Discovery Channel and The Learning Channel. It won the Best Documentary Award at the Atlantic City Film Festival and the Brooklyn International Film Festival. In 2008, the documentary found new life with a screening on April 30, at New York City's Anthology Film Archives, plus the rights of the movie reverted to Cevin, and he made the movie available through mail order.

The War on Kids (2009)

In spring 2009, Cevin's documentary The War on Kids won "best educational documentary" for the New York International Independent Film and Video Festival. While the movie had a week-long run at New York City's Quad Cinema, Cevin was invited to appear on the Colbert Report in which Cevin explained how schools have been transformed into what are "effectively prisons". The film also screened at universities such as Harvard, and has been reviewed in The New York Times, Variety, and The Huffington Post. The documentary was also featured on The Dr. Nancy Show on MSNBC and Soling was a guest on radio shows such as The Lionel Show on Air America, The Joe Reynolds Show on WOR, and the Leonard Lopate Show on WNYC.

Ikland (2011)

Ikland is a 2011 documentary about a journey into northern Uganda and visit with the notorious Ik people. It was produced by Soling, and directed by Soling and David Hilbert. The Ik were famously described as sadistic monsters by anthropologist Colin Turnbull in his 1972 ethnographic book The Mountain People. Ikland examines Turnball's description within the context of the Iks' lives and circumstances, and reveals the Ik in a more human way. The documentary was the Winner of the "Indie Spec Best Content in a Documentary" award at the 2011 Boston International Film Festival, and was positively reviewed by Discover Magazine and Lonely Planet.

Mr. Cevin and the Cargo Cult (2016)

Mr. Cevin and the Cargo Cult is a 2016 documentary in which Soling sets out to fulfil the tribal prophecy of the cargo cult of John Frum, on the island of Tanna in Vanuatu. It was produced by Soling, and directed by Soling and David Guinan.

We also met Cevin Soling, a documentary-maker from Boston who for years had brought strange cargo – salad spinners, fishing tackle for people who don’t fish, medical equipment – to John Frum believers in Sulphur Bay. “Apparently there was a prophecy I would come,” said Soling, wearing white chinos and a baseball cap. Indeed, in a speech to believers, the chief of Sulphur Bay described him as the “last man” who would reveal the destination of their movement. Soling had tried to turn the whole endeavour into a documentary, and even made necklaces with his own face printed on them..

— Christopher Lord, The Guardian (Nov 27, 2021)

=== Spectacle films ===
Soling runs the New York City-based Spectacle Films, Inc.

== Music career ==
In 1994, Cevin worked with Robert Church to produce Church's Smile Zone album.

=== The Neanderthal Spongecake (1998–2001) ===
In 1998, his band The Neanderthal Spongecake released their debut album, The Side Effects of Napalm. Soling and keyboardist Bill Brandau produced the album along with backing from Buffalo, New York-based band Scary Chicken.

The songs "This Thing" and the acoustic cover of "Metal Health" with Quiet Riot vocalist Kevin Dubrow both received extensive airplay on college and commercial radio in the United States. The song "Tastes Like Chicken" has been played on the Dr. Demento show, and the song "Buffalo" was featured in the closing credits of the A&E series Confessions of a Matchmaker.

In addition to tours, the band had a large following in their hometown of New York City, while the Village Voice listed the group as one of the top five bands performing in 1999's CMJ music conference.

The band broke up in 2001 with the departure of then bassist Mark Tomase and drummer Martin Trum. Additional songs credited to The Neanderthal Spongecake after 2001 are solo recordings by Soling.

=== When Pigs Fly (2002) ===
In 2002, Cevin served as executive producer of the album When Pigs Fly: Songs You Never Thought You'd Hear, which is a collection of popular songs recorded by artists unlikely to record them. After his earlier success convincing Kevin DuBrow of Quiet Riot to record a mellow version of the song "Metal Health" with him, he got the idea for the project and began recruiting musicians to participate. Some of the songs on the album include a version of "Unforgettable" by Ani DiFranco and Jackie Chan, which he co-produced with DiFranco, Blondie's "Call Me" by Alex Chilton and his band The Box Tops, and a cover of "Shock the Monkey" by Don Ho which Cevin also produced.

=== The Love Kills Theory (2007–present) ===
Cevin is lead singer and songwriter of the band The Love Kills Theory. Their album Happy Suicide, Jim! was released in January 2007. It charted on CMJ's top 200 and was played in rotation on over 70 commercial radio stations.

== Print media ==
His poetry earned him the title "Pharaoh of Fluff" at the 2009 Fluff Celebration in Somerville, Massachusetts. He has also written a series of ten illustrated books under the heading of The Rumpleville Chronicles. The first three titles, The Jolly Elf, The Disciples of Trotsky, and The Bomb that Followed Me Home were released in the winter of 2008 through Monk Media.
