= Belfast Blitz =

World War II German air raids

- Part of the Strategic bombing campaign of World War II
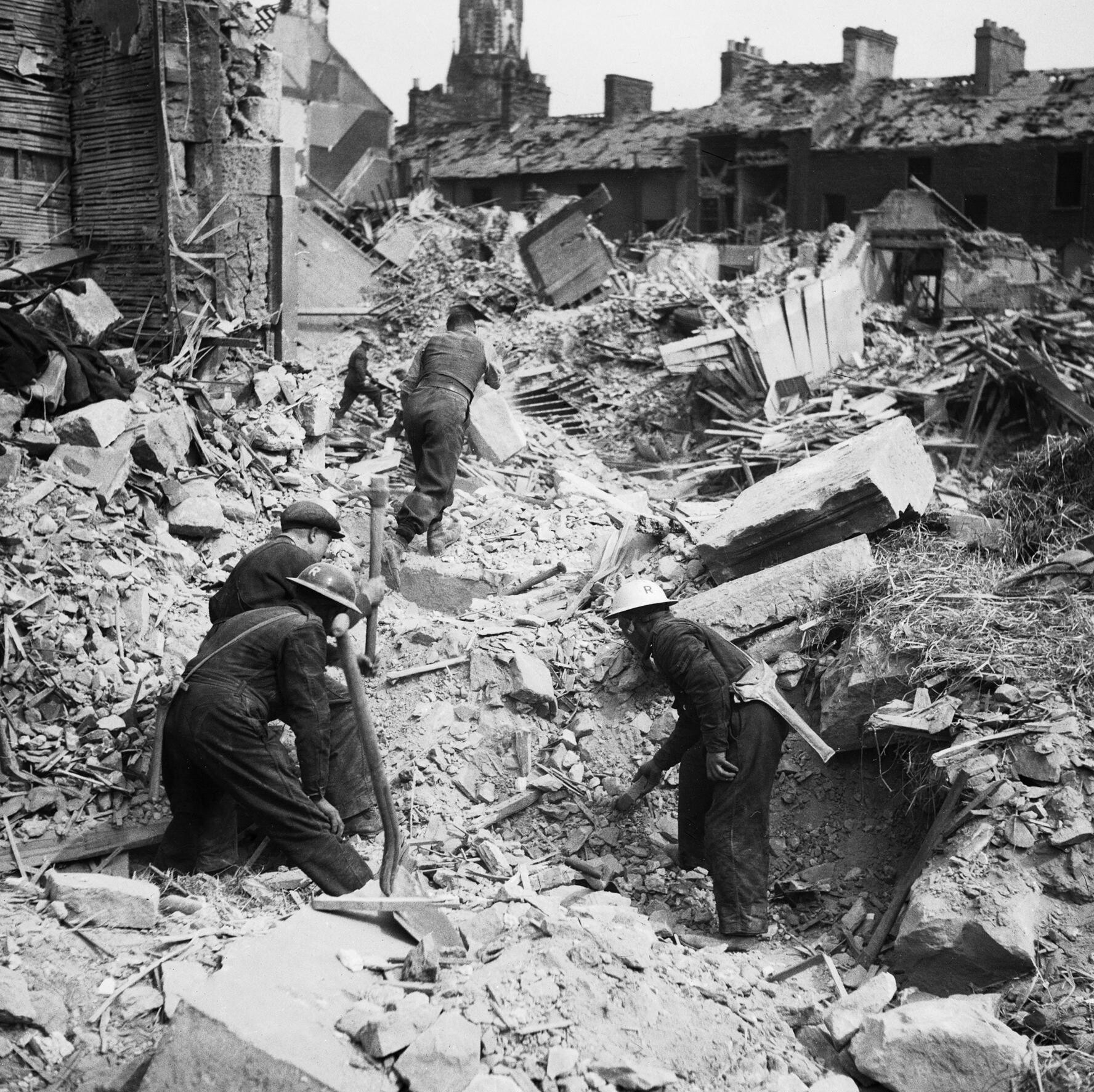
- Rescue workers searching through rubble after an air raid on Belfast
Date	7 April – 6 May 1941
Location	Belfast

Belligerents
United Kingdom	Germany

Commanders and leaders
(United Kingdom) Winston Churchill	(Nazi Germany) Adolf Hitler

Casualties and losses
~1,200 dead ~1,500 injured 30–50,000 houses damaged	

The Belfast Blitz consisted of four German air raids on strategic targets in the city of Belfast in Northern Ireland, in April and May 1941 during World War II, causing high casualties. The first was on the night of 7–8 April 1941, a small attack which probably took place only to test Belfast's defences. The next took place on Easter Tuesday, 15 April 1941, when 200 Luftwaffe bombers attacked military and manufacturing targets in the city of Belfast. Some 987 people died as a result of the bombing and 1,500 were injured. High explosive bombs predominated in this raid. Apart from those on London, this was the greatest loss of life in any night raid during the Blitz.

The third raid on Belfast took place over the evening and morning of 4–5 May 1941; 200 were killed. Incendiary bombs predominated in this raid. The fourth and final Belfast raid took place on the following night, 5–6 May. In total over 1,300 houses were demolished, some 5,000 badly damaged, nearly 30,000 slightly damaged while 20,000 required "first aid repairs".

== Background ==
As the UK was preparing for the conflict, the factories and shipyards of Belfast were gearing up. Belfast made a considerable contribution towards the Allied war effort, producing many naval ships, aircraft and munitions; therefore, the city was deemed a suitable bombing target by the Luftwaffe.

Unlike Northern Ireland, Éire was no longer part of the UK. Under the leadership of Éamon de Valera it had declared its neutrality during the Second World War. Although it arrested German spies that its police and military intelligence services caught, the state never broke off diplomatic relations with Axis nations: the German Legation in Dublin remained open throughout the war.

=== Government ===
The Government of Northern Ireland lacked the will, energy and capacity to cope with a major crisis when it came. James Craig, Lord Craigavon, had been Prime Minister of Northern Ireland since its inception in 1921 up until his death in 1940. His death (along with preceding ill-health) came at a bad time and arguably inadvertently caused a leadership vacuum. Richard Dawson Bates was the Home Affairs Minister. Sir Basil Brooke, the Minister of Agriculture, was the only active minister. He successfully busied himself with the task of making Northern Ireland a major supplier of food to Britain.

John Clarke MacDermott, the Minister of Public Security, after the first bombing, initiated the "Hiram Plan" to evacuate the city and to return Belfast to 'normality' as quickly as possible. It was MacDermott who sent a telegram to de Valera seeking assistance. There was unease with the complacent attitude of the government, which led to resignations:

- John Edmond Warnock, the parliamentary secretary at the Ministry of Home Affairs, resigned from the government on 25 May 1940. He said, "I have heard speeches about Ulster pulling her weight but they have never carried conviction" and "the government has been slack, dilatory and apathetic."
- Lieutenant Colonel Alexander Gordon, Parliamentary and Financial Secretary at the Ministry of Finance (i.e. Chief Whip), resigned on 13 June 1940, explaining to the Commons that the government was "quite unfitted to sustain the people in the ordeal we have to face."

Craigavon died on 24 November 1940. He was succeeded by J. M. Andrews, then 69 years old, who was no more capable of dealing with the situation than his predecessor. On 28 April 1943, six members of the Government threatened to resign, forcing him from office. He was replaced by 54-year-old Sir Basil Brooke on 1 May.

=== Manufacturing facilities ===
- Harland and Wolff was one of the largest shipbuilding yards in the world. It had constructed many ships for the White Star Line like RMS Titanic and RMS Olympic and for the Royal Navy, including aircraft carriers such as HMS Formidable and Unicorn; the cruisers, HMS Belfast and Penelope as well as 131 other naval vessels. Up to 35,000 people were employed.
- During the war years, Belfast shipyards built or converted over 3,000 navy vessels, repaired more than 22,000 others and launched over half a million tons of merchant shipping – over 140 merchantmen.
- Short Brothers manufactured aircraft. They are best known for the Sunderland flying boat and the Stirling long-range heavy bomber. Up to 20,000 people were employed. The factory was re-equipping as early as 1936 for the manufacture of 189 Handley Page Hereford bombers.
- James Mackie & Sons were re-equipped in 1938. They were the primary supplier of Bofors anti-aircraft shells.
- Harland's Engineering works built tanks. They designed the Churchill.
- Aero linen for covering aircraft, such as the Hawker Hurricane, and military glider frames, was manufactured by a number of Belfast flax spinning mills, such as The York Street Flax Spinning Co.; Brookfield Spinning Co.; Wm. Ewart's Rosebank Weaving Co.; and the Linen Thread Co.
- Other Belfast factories manufactured gun mountings, ordnance pieces, aircraft parts and ammunition.

War materials and food were sent by sea from Belfast to Great Britain, some under the protection of the neutral Irish tricolour. The M.V. Munster, for example, operated by the Belfast Steamship Company, plied between Belfast and Liverpool under the tricolour, until she hit a mine and was sunk outside Liverpool.

=== British preparation ===
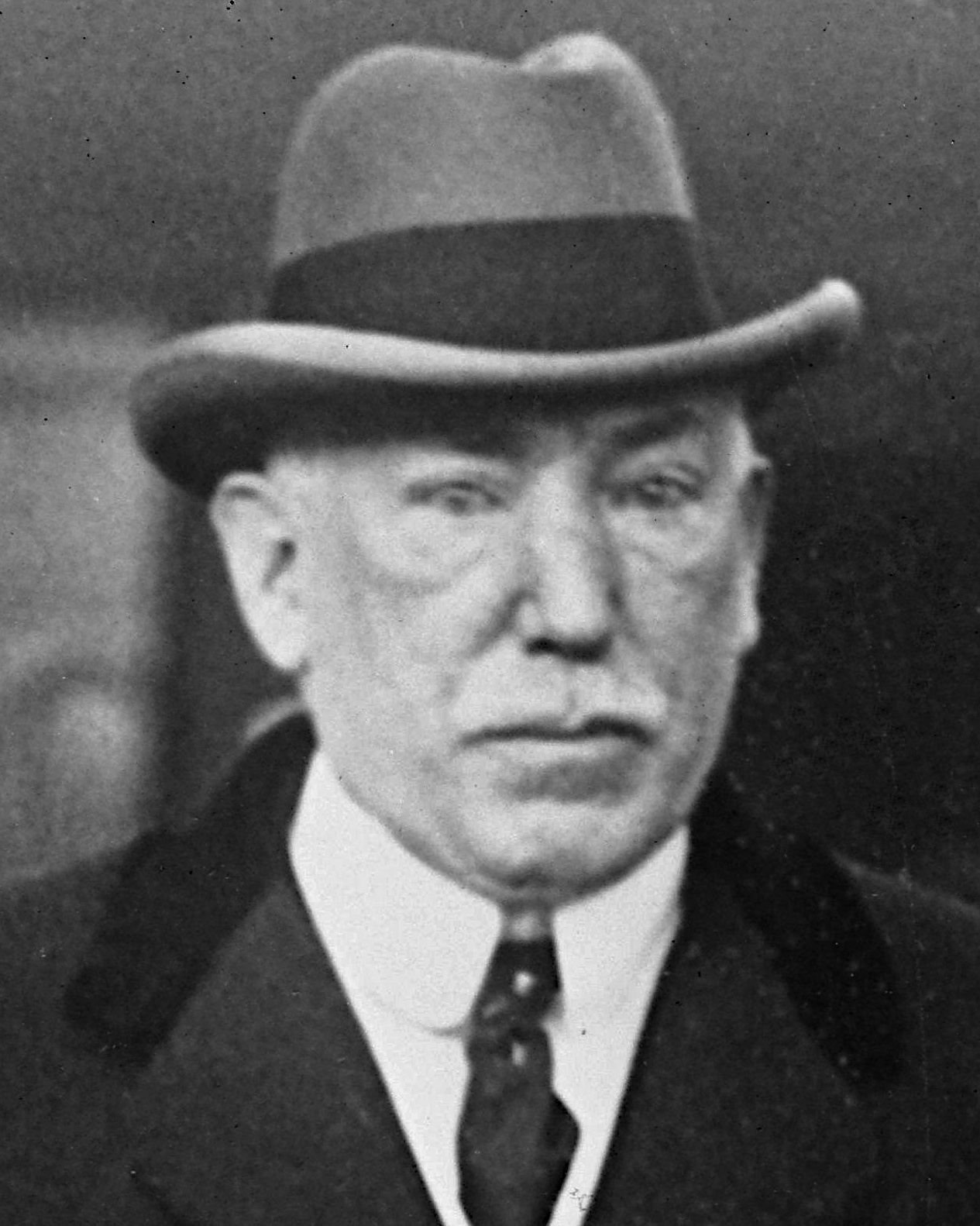
Sir James Craig, Viscount Craigavon, Prime Minister of Northern Ireland until his death in 1940. HMSO image

==== Government preparation ====
There was little preparation for the conflict with Germany. However at the time Lord Craigavon, Prime Minister of Northern Ireland since its inception in 1921, said: "Ulster is ready when we get the word and always will be." He was asked, in the N.I. parliament: "if the government realized 'that these fast bombers can come to Northern Ireland in two and three quarter hours' ". His reply was: "We here today are in a state of war and we are prepared with the rest of the United Kingdom and Empire to face all the responsibilities that imposes on the Ulster people. There is no slacking in our loyalty."

Dawson Bates, the Home Affairs Minister, apparently refused to reply to army correspondence and when the Ministry of Home Affairs was informed by imperial defence experts in 1939 that Belfast was regarded as "a very definite German objective", little was done outside providing shelters in the Harbour area.

==== Air-raid shelters ====
Belfast, the city with the highest population density in the UK at the time, also had the lowest proportion of public air-raid shelters. Prior to the "Belfast Blitz" there were only 200 public shelters in the city, although around 4,000 households had built their own private shelters. The high water table in Belfast meant Anderson Shelters were largely unsuitable. Moreover many households did not have gardens, so Morrison Shelters were provided, but not in the numbers required. The local authority focused on constructing surface communal shelters.

No searchlights were set up in the city at the time, and these only arrived on 10 April. There was no smokescreen ability, however there were some barrage balloons positioned strategically for protection. Given Belfast's geographic position, it was considered to be at the fringe of the operational range of German bombers and hence there was no provision for night-fighter aerial cover. Indeed, on the night of the first raid, no Royal Air Force (RAF) aircraft took to the air to intercept German planes. On the ground, there were only 22 anti-aircraft guns positioned around the city, six light and sixteen heavy, and on the first night only seven of these were manned and operational.

==== Children ====
Few children had been successfully evacuated. The "Hiram Plan" initiated by Dawson Bates, the Home Affairs Minister, had failed to materialise. Fewer than 4,000 women and children were evacuated. There were still 80,000 more in Belfast. Even the children of soldiers had not been evacuated, with calamitous results when the married quarters of Victoria Barracks received a direct hit.

=== German preparation ===
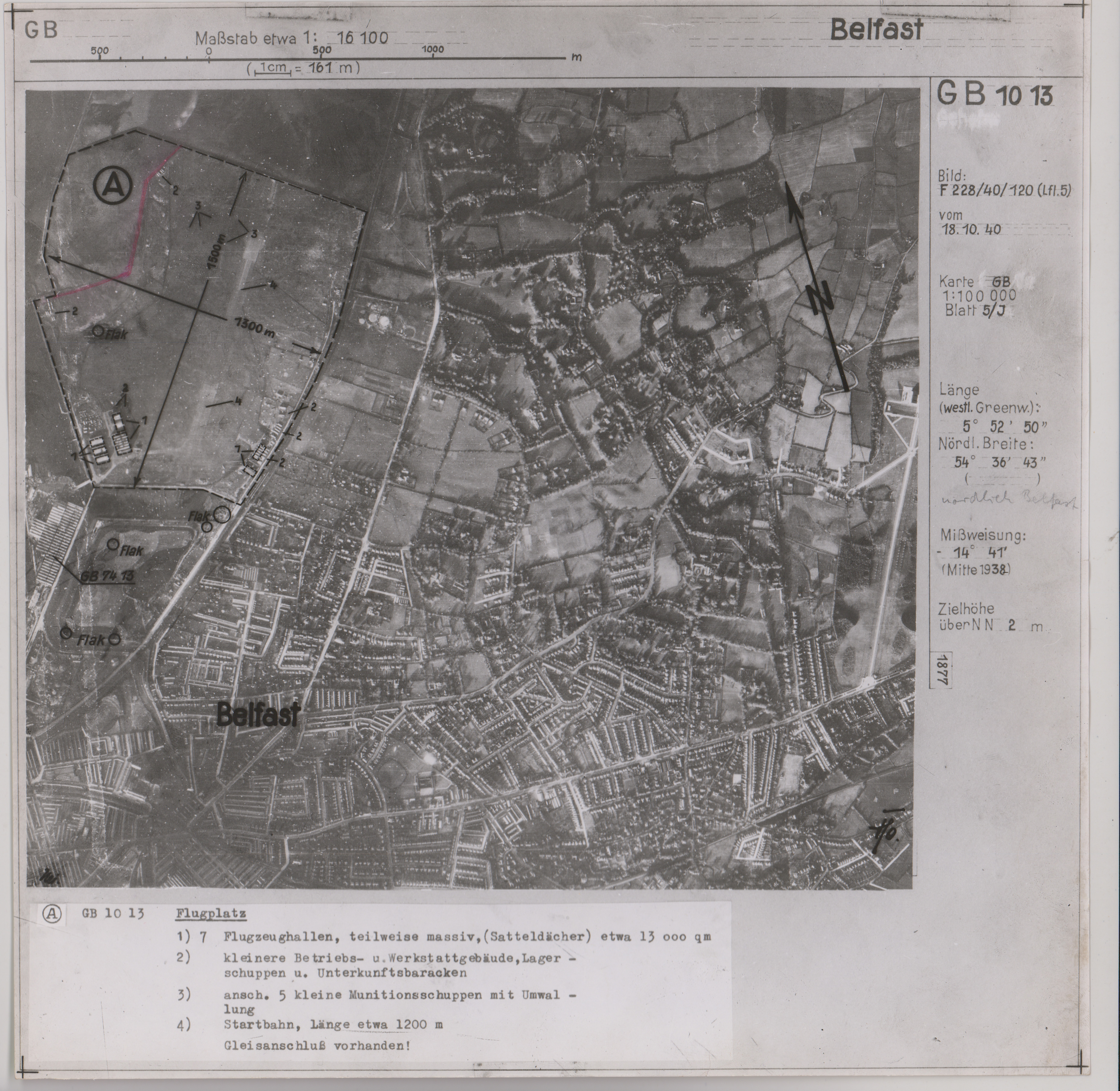
Target dossier of the German Luftwaffe depicting the airport and surrounding anti-aircraft batteries (marked Flak), dated 18th October 1940

From papers recovered after the war, we know of a Luftwaffe reconnaissance flight over Belfast in November 1940. The Germans established that Belfast was defended by only seven anti-aircraft batteries, which made it the most poorly defended city in the United Kingdom. From their photographs, they identified suitable targets:

- Harland and Wolff
- Die Tankstelle Conns Water
- Short and Harland aircraft factory
- The power station of Belfast
- Rank & Co mill
- Belfast waterworks
- Victoria Barracks

J. M. Andrews, Prime Minister of Northern Ireland 1940–43 HMSO image

== Earlier raids ==
There had been a number of small bombings, probably by planes that missed their targets over the River Clyde in Glasgow or the cities of the northwest of England.

On 24 March 1941, John MacDermott, Minister for Security, wrote to Prime Minister John Andrews, expressing his concerns that Belfast was so poorly protected: "Up to now we have escaped attack. So had Clydeside until recently. Clydeside got its blitz during the period of the last moon. There [is] ground for thinking that the ... enemy could not easily reach Belfast in force except during a period of moonlight. The period of the next moon from say the 7th to the 16th of April may well bring our turn." MacDermott would be proved right.

The first deliberate raid took place on the night of 7 April. (Some authors count this as the second raid of four). It targeted the docks. Neighbouring residential areas were also hit. Six Heinkel He 111 bombers, from Kampfgruppe 26, flying at 7,000 feet (2,100 m), dropped incendiaries, high explosive and parachute-mines. By British mainland blitz standards, casualties were light. 13 died, including a soldier killed when an anti-aircraft gun, at the Balmoral show-grounds, misfired. The most significant loss was a 4.5-acre (1.8 ha) factory floor for manufacturing the fuselages of Short Stirling bombers. The Royal Air Force announced that Squadron Leader J.W.C. Simpson shot down one of the Heinkels over Downpatrick. The Luftwaffe crews returned to their base in Northern France and reported that Belfast's defences were, "inferior in quality, scanty and insufficient". This raid overall caused relatively little damage, but a lot was revealed about Belfast's inadequate defences.

== Easter Tuesday Blitz ==
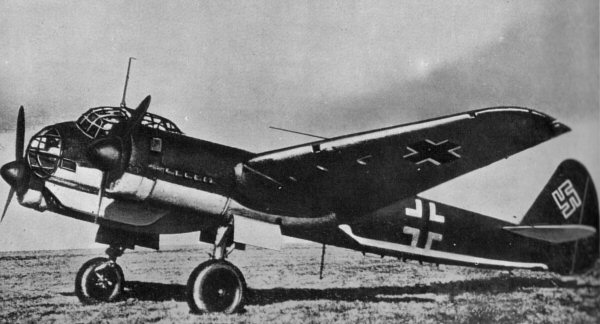
Junkers Ju 88

On Easter Tuesday, 15 April 1941, spectators watching a football match at Windsor Park noticed a lone Luftwaffe Junkers Ju 88 aircraft circling overhead.

That evening over 150 bombers left their bases in northern France and the Netherlands and headed for Belfast. There were Heinkel He 111s, Junkers Ju 88s and Dornier Do 17s. At 10:40 pm the air raid sirens sounded. Accounts differ as to when flares were dropped to light up the city. The first attack was against the city's waterworks, which had been attacked in the previous raid. High explosives were dropped. Initially it was thought that the Germans had mistaken this reservoir for the harbour and shipyards, where many ships, including HMS Ark Royal were being repaired. However that attack was not an error. Three vessels nearing completion at Harland and Wolff's were hit as was its power station. Wave after wave of bombers dropped their incendiaries, high explosives and land-mines. When incendiaries were dropped, the city burned as water pressure was too low for effective firefighting.

Public buildings destroyed or badly damaged included Belfast City Hall's Banqueting Hall, the Ulster Hospital for Women and Children and Ballymacarrett library (the last two being located on Templemore Avenue). Strand Public Elementary school, York Road railway station, the adjacent Midland Hotel on York Road, and Salisbury Avenue tram depot were all hit. Churches destroyed or wrecked included Macrory Memorial Presbyterian in Duncairn Gardens; Duncairn Methodist, Castleton Presbyterian on York Road; St Silas's on the Oldpark Road; St James's on the Antrim Road; Newington Presbyterian on Limestone Road; Crumlin Road Presbyterian; Holy Trinity on Clifton Street and Clifton Street Presbyterian; York Street Presbyterian and York Street Non-Subscribing Presbyterian; Newtownards Road Methodist and Rosemary Street Presbyterian (the last of which was not rebuilt).

Streets heavily bombed in the city centre included High Street, Ann Street, Callender Street, Chichester Street, Castle Street, Tomb Street, Bridge Street (effectively obliterated), Rosemary Street, Waring Street, North Street, Victoria Street, Donegall Street, York Street, Gloucester Street, and East Bridge Street. In the east of the city, Westbourne and Newcastle Streets on the Newtownards Road, Thorndyke Street off the Albertbridge Road and Ravenscroft Avenue were destroyed or damaged. In the west and north of the city, streets heavily bombed included Percy Street, York Park, York Crescent, Eglinton Street, Carlisle Street, Ballyclare, Ballycastle and Ballynure Streets off the Oldpark Road; Southport Street, Walton Street, Antrim Road, Annadale Street, Cliftonville Road, Hillman Street, Atlantic Avenue, Hallidays Road, Hughenden Avenue, Sunningdale Park, Shandarragh Park, and Whitewell Road. Burke Street which ran between Annadale and Dawson streets in the New Lodge area, was completely wiped off the map with all its 20 houses flattened and all of the occupants killed.

There was no opposition. In the mistaken belief that they might damage RAF fighters, the anti-aircraft batteries ceased firing. But the RAF had not responded. The bombs continued to fall until 5 am.

55,000 houses were damaged leaving 100,000 temporarily homeless. Outside of London, with at least 987 dead, this was the greatest loss of life in a night raid during the Blitz. A stray bomber attacked Derry, killing a further 15 people. Another attacked Bangor, killing five more. By 4 am the entire city seemed to be in flames. At 4:15 am John MacDermott, the Minister of Public Security, managed to contact Basil Brooke (then Agriculture Minister), seeking permission to seek help from the Irish government. Brooke noted in his diary "I gave him authority as it is obviously a question of expediency". Since 1:45 am all telephones had been cut. Fortunately, the railway telegraphy link between Belfast and Dublin was still operational. The telegram was sent at 4:35 am, asking the Irish Taoiseach, Éamon de Valera for assistance.

== Human cost ==
Approximately 987 people died and more than 1,500 people were injured, 400 of them seriously. 50,000 houses, more than half the houses in the city, were damaged. 11 churches, two hospitals and two schools were destroyed. These figures are based on newspaper reports of the time, personal recollections and other primary sources, such as:-
Jimmy Doherty, an air raid warden (who later served in London during the V1 and V2 blitz), who wrote a book on the Belfast blitz;
Emma Duffin, a nurse at the Queen's University Hospital, (who previously served during the Great War), who kept a diary;
and Major Seán O'Sullivan, who produced a detailed report for the Dublin government. There are other diarists and narratives. Brian Barton of Queen's University, Belfast, has written most on this topic.

=== Instructions ===
There were few bomb shelters. An air raid shelter on Hallidays Road received a direct hit, killing all those in it. Many people who were dug out of the rubble alive had taken shelter underneath their stairs and were fortunate that their homes had not received a direct hit or caught fire. In the New Lodge area people had taken refuge in a mill. Tragically 35 were crushed to death when the mill wall collapsed. In another building, the York Street Mill, one of its massive sidewalls collapsed on to Sussex and Vere Streets, killing all those who remained in their homes.

Major O'Sullivan reported that "In the heavily 'blitzed' areas people ran panic-stricken into the streets and made for the open country. As many were caught in the open by blast and secondary missiles, the enormous number of casualties can be readily accounted for. It is perhaps true that many saved their lives running but I am afraid a much greater number lost them or became casualties."

That night almost 300 people, many from the Protestant Shankill area, took refuge in the Clonard Monastery in the Catholic Falls Road. The crypt under the sanctuary and the cellar under the working sacristy had been fitted out and opened to the public as an air-raid shelter. Prayers were said and hymns sung by the mainly Protestant women and children during the bombing.

=== Mortuary ===
The mortuary services had emergency plans to deal with only 200 bodies. 150 corpses remained in the Falls Road baths for three days before they were buried in a mass grave, with 123 still unidentified. 255 corpses were laid out in St George's Market. Many bodies and body parts could not be identified. Mass graves for the unclaimed bodies were dug in the Milltown and Belfast City Cemeteries.

=== Nurse Emma Duffin ===
Nurse Emma Duffin, who had served in World War I, contrasted death in that conflict with what she saw:

(Great War casualties) had died in hospital beds, their eyes had been reverently closed, their hands crossed to their breasts. Death had to a certain extent been ... made decent. It was solemn, tragic, dignified, but here it was grotesque, repulsive, horrible. No attendant nurse had soothed the last moments of these victims; no gentle reverent hand had closed their eyes or crossed their hands. With tangled hair, staring eyes, clutching hands, contorted limbs, their grey-green faces covered with dust, they lay, bundled into the coffins, half-shrouded in rugs or blankets, or an occasional sheet, still wearing their dirty, torn twisted garments. Death should be dignified, peaceful; Hitler had made even death grotesque. I felt outraged, I should have felt sympathy, grief, but instead feelings of revulsion and disgust assailed me.

=== Major Seán O'Sullivan ===
Major Seán O'Sullivan reported on the intensity of the bombing in some areas, such as the Antrim Road, where bombs "fell within fifteen to twenty yards of one another." The most heavily bombed area was that which lay between York Street and the Antrim Road, north of the city centre. O'Sullivan felt that the whole civil defence sector was utterly overwhelmed. Heavy jacks were unavailable. He described some distressing consequences, such as how "in one case the leg and arm of a child had to be amputated before it could be extricated."

In his opinion, the greatest want was the lack of hospital facilities. He went to the Mater Hospital at 2 pm, nine hours after the raid ended, to find the street with a traffic jam of ambulances waiting to admit their casualties. He spoke with Professor Flynn, (Theodore Thomson Flynn, an Australian based at the Mater Hospital and father of actor Errol Flynn), head of the casualty service for the city, who told him of "casualties due to shock, blast and secondary missiles, such as glass, stones, pieces of piping, etc." O'Sullivan reported: "There were many terrible mutilations among both living and dead – heads crushed, ghastly abdominal and face wounds, penetration by beams, mangled and crushed limbs etc.". His report concluded with: "a second Belfast would be too horrible to contemplate".

=== Refugees ===
220,000 people fled from the city. Many "arrived in Fermanagh having nothing with them only night shirts". 10,000 "officially" crossed the border. Over 500 received care from the Irish Red Cross in Dublin. The town of Dromara saw its population increase from 500 to 2,500. In Newtownards, Bangor, Larne, Carrickfergus, Lisburn and Antrim many thousands of Belfast citizens took refuge either with friends or strangers.

Major O'Sullivan reported on a:

continuous trek to railway stations. The refugees looked dazed and horror stricken and many had neglected to bring more than a few belongings... Any and every means of exit from the city was availed of and the final destination appeared to be a matter of indifference. Train after train and bus after bus were filled with those next in line. At nightfall the Northern Counties Station was packed from platform gates to entrance gates and still refugees were coming along in a steady stream from the surrounding streets ... Open military lorries were finally put into service and even expectant mothers and mothers with young children were put into these in the rather heavy drizzle that lasted throughout the evening. On the 17th I heard that hundreds who either could not get away or could not leave for other reasons simply went out into the fields and remained in the open all night with whatever they could take in the way of covering.

Moya Woodside noted in her diary: "Evacuation is taking on panic proportions. Roads out of town are still one stream of cars, with mattresses and bedding tied on top. Everything on wheels is being pressed into service. People are leaving from all parts of town and not only from the bombed areas. Where they are going, what they will find to eat when they get there, nobody knows."

Dawson Bates informed the Cabinet of rack-renting of barns, and over thirty people per house in some areas.

=== Newspaper reaction ===
The Irish Times in its editorial on 17 April said:

Humanity knows no borders, no politics, no differences of religious belief. Yesterday for once the people of Ireland were united under the shadow of a national blow. Has it taken bursting bombs to remind the people of this little country that they have common tradition, a common genius and a common home? Yesterday the hand of good-fellowship was reached across the Border. Men from the South worked with men from the North in the universal cause of the relief of suffering.

== Aftermath ==
=== Southern reaction ===
By 6 am, within two hours of the request for assistance, 71 firemen with 13 fire tenders from Dundalk, Drogheda, Dublin, and Dún Laoghaire were on their way to cross the Irish border to assist their Belfast colleagues. In each station volunteers were asked for, as it was beyond their normal duties. In every instance, all stepped forward. They remained for three days, until they were sent back by the Northern Ireland government. By then 250 firemen from Clydeside had arrived.

Taoiseach Éamon de Valera formally protested to Berlin. He followed up with his "they are our people" speech, made in Castlebar, County Mayo, on Sunday 20 April 1941 (Quoted in the Dundalk Democrat dated Saturday 26 April 1941):

In the past, and probably in the present, too, a number of them did not see eye to eye with us politically, but they are our people – we are one and the same people – and their sorrows in the present instance are also our sorrows; and I want to say to them that any help we can give to them in the present time we will give to them whole-heartedly, believing that were the circumstances reversed they would also give us their help whole-heartedly ...

Frank Aiken, the Irish Minister for the Co-ordination of Defensive Measures was in Boston, Massachusetts at the time. He gave an interview saying: "the people of Belfast are Irish people too".

=== German response ===
Initial German radio broadcasts celebrated the raid. A Luftwaffe pilot gave this description "We were in exceptional good humour knowing that we were going for a new target, one of England's last hiding places. Wherever Churchill is hiding his war material we will go ... Belfast is as worthy a target as Coventry, Birmingham, Bristol or Glasgow." William Joyce "Lord Haw-Haw" announced that "The Führer will give you time to bury your dead before the next attack ... Tuesday was only a sample." However Belfast was not mentioned again by the Nazis. After the war, instructions from Joseph Goebbels were discovered ordering it not to be mentioned. It would appear that Adolf Hitler, in view of de Valera's negative reaction, was concerned that de Valera and Irish American politicians might encourage the United States to enter the war.

Eduard Hempel, the German Minister to Ireland, visited the Irish Ministry for External Affairs to offer sympathy and attempt an explanation. J.P. Walshe, assistant secretary, recorded that Hempel was "clearly distressed by the news of the severe raid on Belfast and especially of the number of civilian casualties." He stated that "he would once more tell his government how he felt about the matter and he would ask them to confine the operations to military objectives as far as it was humanly possible. He believed that this was being done already but it was inevitable that a certain number of civilian lives should be lost in the course of heavy bombing from the air".

=== Recriminations ===
The government was blamed by some for inadequate precautions. Tommy Henderson, an Independent Unionist MP in the House of Commons of Northern Ireland, summed up the feeling when he invited the Minister of Home Affairs to Hannahstown and the Falls Road, saying "The Catholics and the Protestants are going up there mixed and they are talking to one another. They are sleeping in the same sheugh (ditch), below the same tree or in the same barn. They all say the same thing, that the government is no good."

A map showing the location of Belfast Lough

US journalist Ben Robertson reported that at night Dublin was the only city without a blackout between New York and Moscow, and between Lisbon and Sweden and that German bombers often flew overhead to check their bearings using its lights, angering the British. One widespread criticism was that the Germans located Belfast by heading for Dublin and following the railway lines north. In The Blitz: Belfast in the War Years, Brian Barton wrote: "Government Ministers felt with justification, that the Germans were able to use the unblacked out lights in the south to guide them to their targets in the North." Barton insisted that Belfast was "too far north" to use radio guidance.

Other writers, such as Tony Gray in The Lost Years state that the Germans did follow their radio guidance beams. Several accounts point out that Belfast, standing at the end of the long inlet of Belfast Lough, would be easily located. Another claim was that the Catholic population in general and the IRA in particular guided the bombers. Barton wrote: "the Catholic population was much more strongly opposed to conscription, was inclined to sympathise with Germany", "...there were suspicions that the Germans were assisted in identifying targets, held by the Unionist population." This view was probably influenced by the decision of the IRA Army Council to support Germany. However they were not in a position to communicate with the Germans, and information recovered from Germany after the war showed that the planning of the blitz was based entirely on German aerial reconnaissance. However on 20 October 1941 the Garda Síochána captured a comprehensive IRA report on captured member Helena Kelly giving a detailed analysis of damage inflicted on Belfast and highlighting prime targets such as Shortt and Harland aircraft factory and RAF Sydenham, describing them as 'the remaining and most outstanding objects of military significance, as yet unblitzed' and suggesting they should be 'bombed by the Luftwaffe as thoroughly as other areas in recent raids'

=== Firemen return south ===
Irish fire crews were ordered to return south before nightfall, will the last crews heading south by 8:00 pm. The political costs were too high should a southern fireman be killed in any renewed attack on the city. Some had received food, others were famished. All were exhausted. Two of the crews received refreshments in Banbridge; others were entertained in the Ancient Order of Hibernians hall in Newry. In 1995, on the 50th anniversary of the ending of the Second World War, an invitation was received by the Dublin Fire Brigade for any survivors of that time to attend a function at Hillsborough Castle and meet Prince Charles. Only four were known still to be alive. One, Tom Coleman, attended to receive recognition for his colleagues' solidarity at such a critical time.

=== Second major raid ===
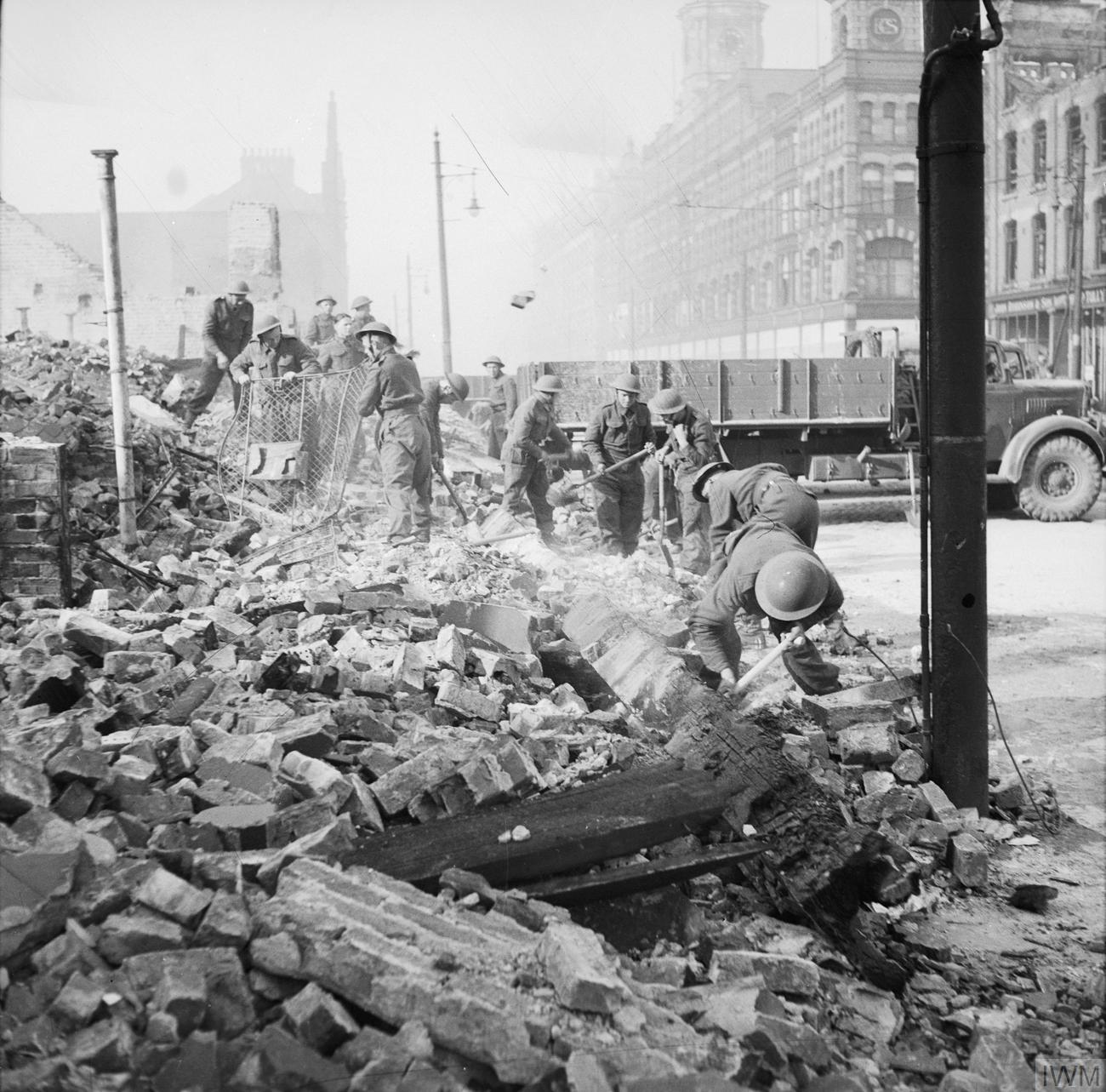
Soldiers clearing rubble after the May air raid

There was a second massive air raid on Belfast on Sunday 4–5 May 1941, three weeks after that of Easter Tuesday. Around 1 am, Luftwaffe bombers flew over the city, concentrating their attack on the Harbour Estate and Queen's Island. Nearby residential areas in east Belfast were also hit when "203 metric tonnes of high explosive bombs, 80 land mines attached to parachutes, and 800 firebomb canisters containing 96,000 incendiary bombs" were dropped. Over 200 people died in what became known as the 'Fire Raid'.

Casualties were lower than at Easter, partly because the sirens had sounded at 11.45 pm while the Luftwaffe attacked more cautiously from a greater height. St George's Church in High Street was damaged by fire. Again the Irish emergency services crossed the border, this time without waiting for an invitation.

== Media depictions ==
Brian Moore's 1965 novel The Emperor of Ice-Cream, set in Belfast during the Second World War, describes the blitz.

The 2017 film Zoo depicts an air raid during the Belfast Blitz.

The Belfast air raids of April and May 1941 are recounted in the 2025 novel These Days, by Lucy Caldwell.

Post 381, a book by James Doherty, who was an air raid warden during the blitz of Belfast, gives a first-hand account of the Belfast Blitz.

== See also ==
- The Blitz
- Aerial bombing of cities
- Harland and Wolff
- Belfast
- The Emergency
- Bombing of Dublin in World War II
- Ulster Defence Volunteers

== Sources ==
- Brian Barton (2015). The Belfast Blitz: The City in the War Years. Ulster Historical Foundation, 655pp, new extended edition.
- Brian Barton (1989). The Blitz: Belfast in the war years. The Universities Press Ltd. ISBN 978-0-85640-426-9.
- Brian Barton (1995). Northern Ireland in the Second World War. Ulster Historical Foundation. ISBN 978-0-901905-69-7.
- RS Davison, "The Belfast Blitz", The Irish Sword, Vol. XVI, No.63 (1985).
- Stephen Douds, Belfast Blitz: The People's Story, Blackstaff Press, 192pp. (Belfast 2011).
- Robert Fisk, In Time of War: Ireland, Ulster and the price of neutrality 1939–45 (Dublin 1983).
- Tony Gray, The Lost Years: The Emergency in Ireland 1939–1945. ISBN 0-7515-2333-X.
- Elaine McClure, Bodies in our Backyard, Ulster Society Publications (Lurgan 1993).
- Brian Moore, The Emperor of Ice Cream, novel set in the Belfast Blitz. McClelland and Stewart (Canada), 1965.
- John Potter, The Belfast Blitz http://www.niwarmemorial.org/wp-content/uploads/2011/11/The_Belfast_Blitz.pdf
- Clair Willis (2007). That Neutral Island. Faber and Faber. ISBN 978-0-571-22105-9.
- Public Record Office of Northern Ireland, Historical Topics Series 2, The Belfast Blitz, 2007, http://www.proni.gov.uk/historical_topics_series_-_02_-_the_belfast_blitz.pdf
- https://www.niwarmemorial.org/the-belfast-blitz The Belfast Blitz, at Northern Ireland War Memorial Museum
