= Always Mine =

Always Mine may refer to:

- "Always Mine" (Selena song)
- "Always Mine", a song by the Morning After Girls from Shadows Evolve
- "Always Mine", a song by Brand Nubian from Fire in the Hole
