= The Emperor of Ice-Cream =

Poem written by Wallace Stevens

The Emperor of Ice-Cream
Recitation

The Emperor of Ice-Cream

Call the roller of big cigars,
The muscular one, and bid him whip
In kitchen cups concupiscent curds.
Let the wenches dawdle in such dress
As they are used to wear, and let the boys
Bring flowers in last month's newspapers.
Let be be finale of seem.
The only emperor is the emperor of ice-cream.

Take from the dresser of deal,
Lacking the three glass knobs, that sheet
On which she embroidered fantails once
And spread it so as to cover her face.
If her horny feet protrude, they come
To show how cold she is, and dumb.
Let the lamp affix its beam.
The only emperor is the emperor of ice-cream.

"The Emperor of Ice-Cream" is a poem by Wallace Stevens, from his first collection of poetry, Harmonium (1923). Stevens' biographer, Paul Mariani, identifies the poem as one of Stevens' personal favorites from Harmonium. The poem "wears a deliberately commonplace costume", he wrote in a letter, "and yet seems to me to contain something of the essential gaudiness of poetry; that is the reason why I like it".

== Structure and meaning ==
The simple poetic structure is of two stanzas related by an identical closing verse in each stanza. The poem is only clarified in its allusion upon completion of the reading of the second stanza which identifies a "cold" and "dumb" body as common references to a dead body. In this case a dead body is being prepared for a funeral.

According to the critic Helen Vendler, quoted by Austin Allen, the ice-cream in the poem is being prepared for serving at a funeral wake. The use of holiday sweets and heavy desserts for funerals is part of the culture of varying civilizations. In this case the reference is likely to Cuba, which Stevens visited during business trips to Florida. The "emperor" of ice cream is illustrated through imagery by Stevens as sufficiently muscular to churn the ice-cream and blend in the sugar to make the customary funeral treat used in the country.

In his book on Stevens, Thomas C. Grey sees the poem as a harsh didactic lesson studying the use of the metaphor of "coldness." Grey states, "Stevens knows the corruptions of coldness as well as its beauties. Chief among them is the heartless selfishness, represented by the sweet sinister cold of 'The Emperor of Ice-Cream.' In the kitchen a cigar-rolling man whips 'concupiscent curds' of ice cream as the wenches come and go; in the adjoining bedroom, a dead woman lies in undignified discard, 'cold ... and dumb' under a sheet, her horny feet protruding. Both rooms teach the cynical wisdom that 'The only emperor is the emperor of ice-cream': what you see is what you get; look out for Number One; enjoy the sweet cold before the bitter cold claims you."

According to Norman Foerster, instigator of the New Humanist movement in American criticism, this poem has been discussed for a long time, but maybe we mistake an exact meaning. Foerster wrote: “At this funeral (or wake) there is to be neither the pretense nor the fact of morbid grief.” These are expressed by ice-cream in this poem. At the same time there is neither disrespect for the dead nor a blinking of the fact of poverty and death. The world of his poem is a realistic and stable one.

According to Syunsuke Kamei, an honorary professor at the University of Tokyo and a scholar of American literature, this poem was composed by Stevens for his daughter. Stevens had a strong sense of fulfillment of life. He did not see death in a special light. This poem is telling us to take things easy, but seriously. Ice cream is an incarnation of a sense of fulfillment. It is easily melted, but it is a natural thing. Stevens tells us to enjoy the ice cream now. Ice-cream is a symbol of the summit of ordinary people’s delight.

== In popular culture ==
- Composer Roger Reynolds wrote an avant garde, mixed-media dramatization of the poem for eight vocal soloists, piano, percussion, and double bass in 1961–62.
- In 1985, composer Gary Kulesha published a revision of his clarinet quartet named after the poem.
- Ken Nordine, beat poet and innovator of a stylistic form known as "word jazz," recorded a rendition of Stevens's poem to the backing of eerily bubbly circus music on his 1994 album Upper Limbo.
- Alternative rock group They Might Be Giants used the phrase "finale of seem" in their 1988 song "Pencil Rain".
- Stephen King made several allusions to this poem; in his novels Salem's Lot and Insomnia; in the short story "Harvey's Dream" from the collection Just After Sunset, and in his miniseries Kingdom Hospital.
- The poem was quoted in the film Pathology.
- Dean Koontz referenced this poem in his book The Good Guy.
- A soap made by the cosmetics company Lush is named "The Emperor of Icecream" after this poem.
- The song "The King of Cream" by The Love Kills Theory is an homage to this poem.
- The Emperor of Ice-Cream (1965) by Brian Moore is a coming-of-age novel set in Belfast.
- An Irish band called itself Emperor of Ice Cream and released two EPs, Puerile and Skin Tight, in 1993.
- The hero of Tom Perotta's Joe College reflects on the poem throughout the novel, wondering what the ice cream symbolizes.
- The heroine of Laura McNeal's National Book Award-nominated novel, Dark Water, reads the poem for a high school class and wonders about its meaning.
- Spenser, the hero of Robert B. Parker's novel School Days, quotes from the poem.
- Author Alan Moore was a member in a band named Emperors of Ice Cream which recorded several songs, including "March of the Sinister Ducks", "Old Gangsters Never Die", and "Mr. A".
- Anthony Cappella published a novel, The Empress of Ice-Cream, in 2010.
- The protagonist of Andrew Smith's novel Grasshopper Jungle frequently cites "The Emperor of Ice-Cream" as his favorite poem.
- Ronald Shannon Jackson quotes the poem in various Last Exit performances.
- The Empire of Ice Cream is the title of a novelette and a short-story collection of the same name by American writer Jeffrey Ford.
- The character Amelia Davenport quotes a portion of the poem in the first episode of the television series Damnation.
- Author Ocean Vuong quotes the line "Let be be finale of seem" in a prologue/quotation board to his 2025 novel "The Emperor of Gladness".

== Bibliography ==
- Morse, Samuel French. "Wallace Stevens: The Poems of Our Climate – Harold Bloom's Vast Accumulation". The Wallace Stevens Journal. Volume 1, Numbers 3 & 4 (Fall/Winter 1977)
- Stevens, Wallace. The Explicator. Vol VII (November 1948), unpaged.
- Vendler, Helen (1984). Words Chosen Out of Desire. University of Tennessee Press.
- The Emperor of Ice Cream: Cummings Study Guide
