= Scary Chicken =

American band

Background information
- Origin: Buffalo, New York, USA
- Genres: Rock
- Years active: 1989 – 2002
- Label: Xemu Records
- Members: Tim Bryant; Tom Greier; Paul Zacks; Dan "Scary" Braun
- Website: http://www.xemurecords.com

Scary Chicken is a Buffalo, New York–based band that was active 1989–2002.

== Formation ==
Formed at the University at Buffalo, the band recorded and released 4 CDs and 2 cassettes, and has had songs placed in multiple Motion Picture Soundtracks and National TV shows, most recently on Spike TV's "Top Dead Center" program.

== Members ==
The band members are Tim Bryant (guitar, vocals), Tom Greier (guitar, vocals), Paul Zacks (bass), Dan "Scary" Braun (drums). Zacks, who died in 2015, had previously been a member of the Rochester, New York–based band The Elephant Balls Experience.

== Club scene ==
Formed in 1989, Scary Chicken passed through the Buffalo college circuit and its growing club scene, to become one of the area's most popular alternative bands. Scary Chicken played extensively in the eastern U.S. throughout the 1990s, primarily between New York City, Chicago, Toronto, and Tennessee.

== Releases ==
Scary Chicken released a series of self-produced and released CDs, including Something Anymore and Flanny EP, before being discovered in 1994 at New York City's Lion's Den club by Cevin Soling of Xemu Records.

== Tours ==
The band was the first to tour Hard Rock Cafe clubs from Boston to Miami, and has shared the stage with Weezer, Sloan, Beck, Ben Folds 5, Goo Goo Dolls, moe., Blue Rodeo and members of Moonboot Lover now playing as Soulive. The band was invited to play several large outdoor "EdgeFest" concerts, and was selected for Buffalo's Thursday at the Square concert series.

== Press ==
From the Band's press kit:

The Hoya, Washington D.C., September 27, 1996

"... Listening to "Is That Your Beer?" probably makes one wonder whether Scary Chicken's sound is amicable listening material for a night out dining with your loved ones. Many of the album's tracks contain hard guitar progressions that would probably sens plates flying off tables. For the Washington, D.C. show, however, they used an acoustic set that made the tracks come off much lighter.

"The band opened the set with "If I Showered," which they released last month and should soon see time on major radio stations. The next song was "Can't Stop It", one of the songs that was written by Greier. This song, like most of those written by Greier on the album, is softer—more "chick rockish" according to Greier. The other songs on the album were written by Bryant who Greier says writes "witty and insane" pieces.

"Some of Bryant's highlights include "Favorite Channel", a powerful, simultaneously poignant love song that was inspired by a remote control button, and "Road to Hell," which he wrote because of his father's favorite expression: "The road to Hell is paved with good intentions."

"This tour shows that Scary Chicken will be playing for larger audiences in the very near future."

Democrat and Chronicle, Rochester, N.Y. June 27, 1996

"Prank calls and beer guzzling: It's all part of playing Chicken."

Artvoice, Buffalo, N.Y. December 4, 1995

In a June 16 review was published in the Buffalo News "With two singers, Scary Chicken lays down sweet harmonies and rocking melodies over sometimes heavy guitar licks and interesting chord progressions. With songs like "Furburger", "Nuke The Whales", and "Tip Your Bartender" also included in Scary Chicken's repertoire, the fun, cynicism, and wit sometimes catches you off guard. This is what makes the band great though: great music combined with fun, zanyness (Tim Bryant has been known to ask the audience if he can spit down someone's throat for fifty cents!), mystery (Paul had his car—or should I say, "grocery-getter"—stolen right before Scary Chicken was to hit the stage at Broadway Joe's a while back!), and atmosphere.

"As Scary Chicken is symbolic of the Buffalo Music scene, I have hopes and confidence that the chickens are on to bigger and better things. Many of their fans are die-hards and new people are always impressed."

The Buffalo News June 16, 1995

Local Record Pick

"Is That Your Beer?" by Scary Chicken Buffalo band on Xemu Records, an independent label out of New York...The Chicken cooks with the jangling guitar rock on the opening cut, "If I Showered". The beat picks up on the hard driving "Cementhead". Scary Chicken adds a touch of country pop to "Can't Stop It" and displays a tough edge on "Found". The group pounds away with power on "Locked Up". This album proves the band is ready for the big time with a national release."

Night-Life Magazine June 5, 1995

"Scary Chicken, and 11-song CD called "Is That Your Beer?" with live introductions, occasional crow noise, an intermission and a secret 33rd track.

"The spoken intros give the impression that this might have been recorded live in concert, an impression reinforced by the rawness of the sound. A check of the liner notes, however, reveals that all this seemingly messy spontaneity was actually laid down in a studio. Well, make that three studios.

"Scary Chicken has a marvelous sense of what makes a pop tune click. Everything they write seems to have a melody and a clever chorus."

== Discography ==
=== Official albums ===
- 2003: Holly Ann – Rocktwig Recordings (self released)
- 1998: Top Dead Center – Xemu Records
- 1995: Is That Your Beer? – Xemu Records
- 1992: Something Anymore – Rocktwig Recordings (self released)

=== Compilations and others ===
- 1998: The Side Effects of Napalm – Xemu Records

Scary Chicken is the backing band on all tracks on this record, including the acoustic version of Quiet Riot's "Metal Health" which Kevin Dubrow sings on.

- 1996 The Shredd-n-Ragan TV Theme CD – Shredd and Ragan
- 1995 Freak Talks About Sex original soundtrack Dizzy Records/Owasco Entertainment
- 1994: Crimson Lights Sound Track – Xemu Records

=== Self-releases ===
- 1993: Flanny EP an independent cassette release.
- 1991: And Then Some... an independent cassette release.
- xxxx: Barfskidnougat an independent cassette release.

=== Songs in films and TV ===
- 2007 – Song: Buffalo by Neanderthal Spongecake Show: Confessions of a Matchmaker
- 2004 - Song: Top Dead Center Speedvision Channel – Show: Top Dead Center
- 1999 – Song: Favorite Channel Movie: Freak Talks About Sex – directed by Paul Todisco
- 1995 – Song: Road to Hell Movie: Far East – directed by Russ Jasquith
- 1994 – Song: Wintertime Movie: Crimson Lights – directed by John Brenkus

=== Singles ===
- 1996: If I Showered – Xemu Records

=== Videos ===
- 1996: If I Showered – Xemu Records
- 1996: Band Profile – Aired on TV on Buffalo's Nickel City Scene show
