= Ikland =

- theatrical release poster
- Directed by: Cevin Soling; Hilbert David
- Written by: Cevin Soling
- Produced by: Cevin Soling
- Cinematography: David Pluth
- Edited by: Hilbert
- Music by: Sacha Lucashenko
- Production company: Spectacle Films, Inc.
- Release date: April 21, 2011 (Boston International Film Festival)
- Running time: 88 minutes
- Country: United States
- Languages: English, (with translations of Swahili, Karamojong, Dodoth, and Icietot)

Ikland is a 2011 documentary film about a journey through the mountains of northeastern Uganda, along the Kenyan border, toward an encounter with the Ik. Ikland was produced by Cevin Soling, and directed by Soling and Hilbert David.

The Ik were described in anthropologist Colin Turnbull's 1972 work The Mountain People as callous and indifferent. Ikland follows the documentary makers as they meet with the Ik, and revisits Turnbull's description in the context of local circumstances.

== Background ==
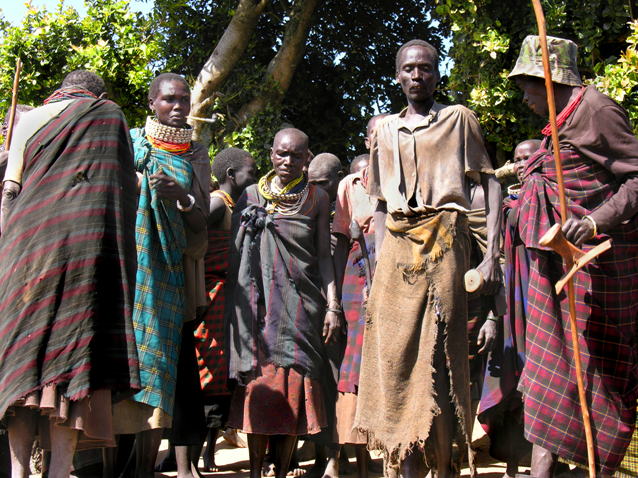
Ik villagers from the film

Anthropologist Colin Turnbull studied the Ik during the mid-1960s, while the region was suffering an oppressive drought. His research informed the controversial book The Mountain People, which he published in 1972. Turnbull described the Ik as a culture which had grown depraved as a consequence of prolonged hardship and destitution. They abandoned their children, stole food from elders, and threw human feces at each other for fun. Turnbull concluded that the Ik would eventually die out, and urged the Ugandan government to forcibly disperse survivors, and dilute their identity within disparate reaches of the country.

== Plot ==
Episodes of violence had made travel to the region both hazardous and difficult in the years following Turnbull's departure. On their way north from Kampala, Soling's crew encountered both friendly tribesmen and armed militia, eventually reaching the Ik after many experiences. Soling convinced Ik residents of a particularly remote village to perform a theatrical adaptation of Charles Dickens' A Christmas Carol, as a metaphor for the redemption of their international reputations.

== Production ==
=== Pre-production ===
Cevin Soling was first introduced to the Ik during the seventh grade, when his teacher assigned his class to read a Lewis Thomas essay entitled "The Iks." The class responded with amusement, instead of the horror their teacher anticipated. Students found the stories of Ik barbarism absurd and comical. Soling never forgot the assignment, and saved the photocopied essay into adulthood.

Soling announced that he wanted to film in Uganda during the summer of 2004. Fanny Walker joined the crew as a drama instructor. Production manager Nichole Smaglick approached a National Geographic production in southern Uganda, but could only recruit cinematographer David Pluth, because no one else would risk travel in the north.

=== Filming ===
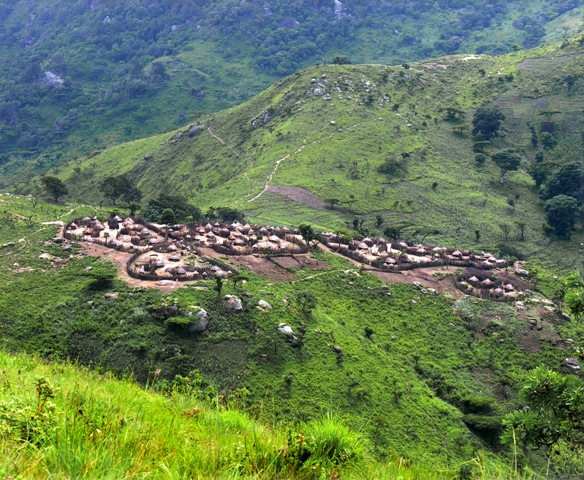
The Ik village in northern Uganda

Pluth sustained injuries from an elephant attack in late 2004, which delayed production for several months. Soling flew with Walker from New York to Entebbe in February 2005. There they met Pluth, Smaglick, and assistant director Lawrence Owongo. While traveling north, the team was arrested by the Uganda People's Defence Force, who released them only after destroying much of their footage.

The Ik were terrified that the crew might be agents of the Lord's Resistance Army, and stayed away until they felt sure of their safety. According to Soling, the tribe was unaware of The Mountain People text, but did know of a man called Turnbull who had spread "malicious lies" about them. It took time for the villagers to grow comfortable with the crew, but interviews thereafter were loose and conversational.

=== Post-production ===
Soling approached Hilbert David during the spring of 2009, entrusting him with some 67 hours of original footage. An additional 3 hours shot by Turnbull during the 1960s was provided by the Smithsonian Institution. Hilbert was given complete artistic freedom during post-production, while he assembled the film without a script.

Hilbert presented much of the film as a collage of matted images, creating what one reviewer called a "postcard" effect. Original music was composed and performed by Sacha Lucashenko. Sound was edited and mixed by Martin Trum, and opening credits were designed by Neil Stuber.

== Reception ==
The documentary was the winner of the "Indie Spec Best Content in a Documentary" award at the 2011 Boston International Film Festival, and was positively reviewed by The New York Times, Variety, and Lonely Planet. Ikland was named among the best films of 2012 by critics Kam Williams and Louis Proyect
