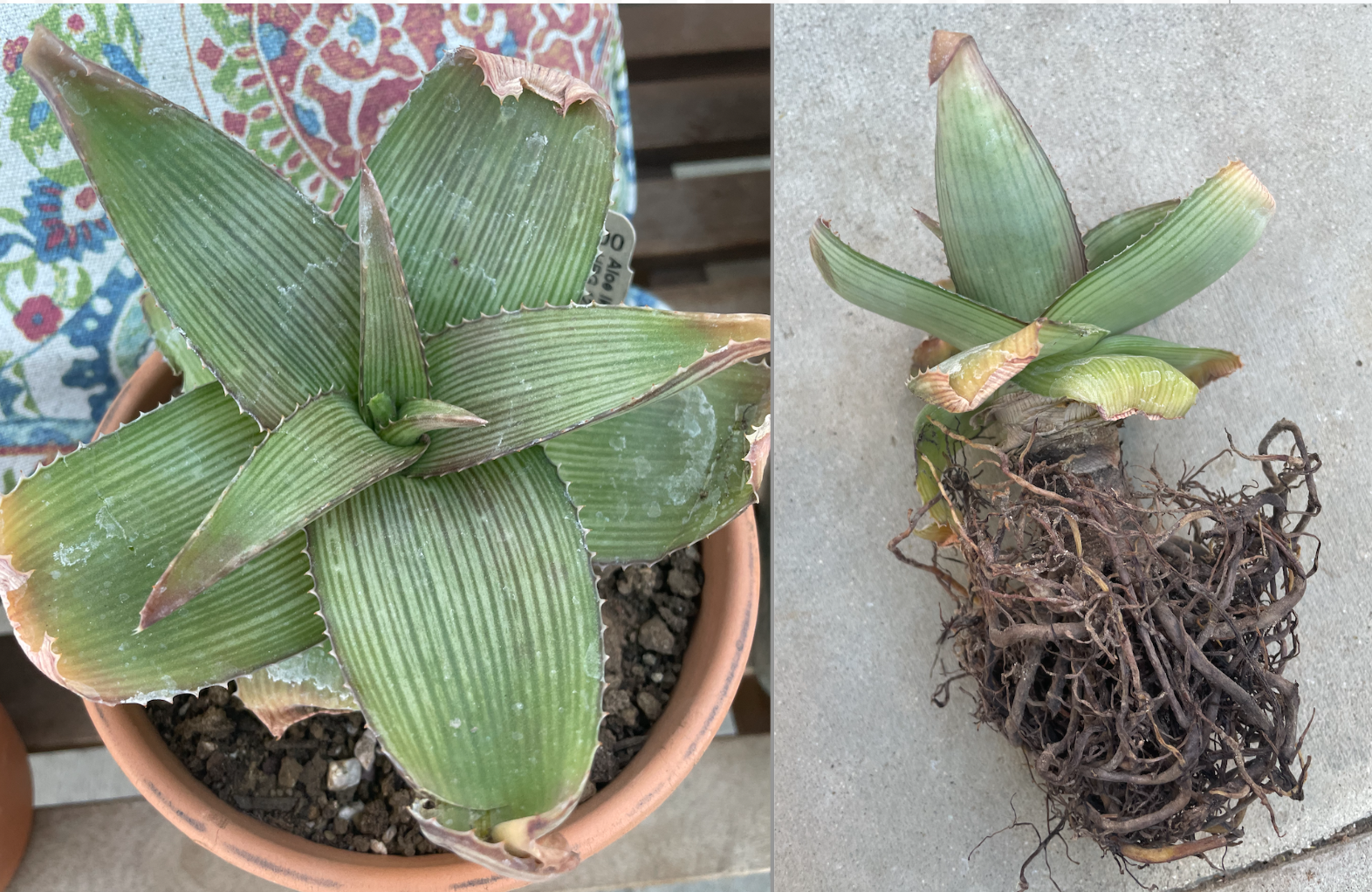

Conservation status
- Critically Endangered (IUCN 3.1)
- CITES Appendix II

Scientific classification
- Kingdom: Plantae
- Clade: Tracheophytes
- Clade: Angiosperms
- Clade: Monocots
- Order: Asparagales
- Family: Asphodelaceae
- Subfamily: Asphodeloideae
- Genus: Aloe
- Species: A. ikiorum

Binomial name
- Aloe ikiorum Dioli & G.Powys

= Aloe ikiorum =

Species of succulent

Aloe ikiorum is a species of Aloe native to northeast Uganda. The name references the Ik people indigenous to the area.

== Habitat ==
Grows on the rift valley facing the Ugandan Enscarpment in near the Oropoi Border Post crossing into Uganda in tall grass.[2]

== Description ==
Leaves in rosette, and has white stripes very simlair to Aloe karabergensis. Leaves not as meaty as Aloe karabergensis. Plants that are mature can get to about 1 meter in diameter.

== Flowers ==
Flowers on racemes that branch and the flowers themselves are tublar and orange. Tips are green and may have black stripe (1-3 of them if present).
