= Happy Suicide, Jim! =

Studio album by The Love Kills Theory
- Released: January 9, 2007
- Recorded: 2006
- Genre: Alternative Rock; Post-punk
- Label: Xemu Records
- Producer: Cevin Soling

Happy Suicide, Jim! is The Love Kills Theory's debut full length album that was released on January 9, 2007. It was published on Xemu Records, mixed by Martin Trum, engineered by Jim Sommers, and produced by Cevin Soling.

== Overview ==
The album was recorded at The Loft, Cheektowaga, and Penny Lane in New York City. For one week that January the album peaked at number 162 on CMJs Top 200. The album was also #1 on KZMU and had a long run in the top 5 albums in Montreal. The song "Authenticity" was played and featured on the Public Radio Exchange.

Lyrics are written by Soling, who claims to be influenced by writers such as Guy Debord, founder of the Situationist International, and Aldous Huxley, author of Brave New World and Yellow Chrome. The album lyrics also focus on the "bio-genetic studies on the evolution of despair" and outline opposition to the instant gratification of consumer culture. The album cover and name are a reference to cult leader Jim Jones.

== Track listing ==
#	Song	Length	Credits
01	"Authenticity"	3:23	C. Soling
02	"The Love Kills Theory"	3:55	C. Soling
03	"Something Goes Around"	3:35	C. Soling
04	"Found"	3:18	C. Soling
05	"Region of the Worms"	3:46	C. Soling
06	"Gray"	3:33	C. Soling
07	"Vacuum Space"	4:15	C. Soling
08	"Suicide Girls"	2:23	C. Soling
09	"The Poverty of Student Life"	4:36	C. Soling
10	"This Thing"	3:56	C. Soling
11	"King of Cream"	4:17	C. Soling
12	"44"	2:25	C. Soling
13	"Dream of Sleep"	4:39	C. Soling

== Personnel ==
musicians

- Cevin Soling - vocals, guitar
- Bill Brandau - keyboards
- Jim Minics - guitar
- Darren Pilato - bass
- Jaron Stewart - drums

production

- Cevin Soling - Producer
- Martin Trum - Mixing
- Jim Sommers - Engineer
