= Someone Like You (2001 film) =

2001 film by Tony Goldwyn

- Theatrical release poster
- Directed by: Tony Goldwyn
- Screenplay by: Elizabeth Chandler
- Based on: Animal Husbandry by Laura Zigman
- Produced by: Lynda Obst
- Starring: Ashley Judd; Greg Kinnear; Hugh Jackman; Marisa Tomei; Ellen Barkin
- Cinematography: Anthony B. Richmond
- Edited by: Dana Congdon
- Music by: Rolfe Kent
- Distributed by: 20th Century Fox
- Release date: March 30, 2001 (United States)
- Running time: 97 minutes
- Country: United States
- Language: English
- Budget: $23 million
- Box office: $38.6 million

Someone Like You is a 2001 American romantic comedy film directed by Tony Goldwyn, based on Laura Zigman's 1998 novel Animal Husbandry. The film stars Ashley Judd, Greg Kinnear, Hugh Jackman, Marisa Tomei, and Ellen Barkin, and follows a heartbroken woman looking for a reason why she was dumped.

== Plot ==
Jane Goodale is a production assistant for a talk show that has recently become nationally syndicated. Her boss, host Diane Roberts is always pushing her staff to book ungettable guests, like Fidel Castro. Jane has a friendly but adversarial relationship with fellow producer, Eddie Alden, a shameless serial womanizer.

When new producer Ray Brown arrives, Jane is immediately smitten. Despite Ray admitting to having a serious girlfriend, Dee, he and Jane begin an affair. Eddie runs into them on the sidewalk and deduces the relationship, expressing skepticism to Jane that it'll last. After several weeks, Ray confesses his love for Jane and asks her to move in with him.

Ray ends things with Dee, but seems troubled by her lack of apparent emotion to the news, and begins enthusiastically apartment hunting with Jane. They find a place they love and begin to move forward, but Ray suddenly becomes distant and after much delay tells Jane his feelings have changed and he no longer wants to be with her. Since her apartment has been re-rented, Jane is left with nowhere to live and becomes Eddie's roommate.

Jane reads a magazine article about bovine sexuality, learning that bulls lose interest in intercourse with cows after they've already mated with them once. Jane excitedly tells her best friend, Liz, about the article and her belief that it applies to men—she is an "old cow" who has been already serviced, so Ray lost interest in her, which would also explain Jane's past bad luck with men.

Liz, after experiencing heartbreak herself, proposes Jane write a column about her theory, under the pen name Dr. Marie Charles for the men's magazine Liz works for. The article is a huge success, becoming widely discussed in the news. Diane demands her staff book Dr. Charles for the show.

At a Christmas party, Ray tells Jane he misses her, asking her out for New Year's Eve, but he stands her up. The next day, Ray admits he's reunited with Dee, who is revealed to be Diane. Eddie comforts Jane and helps her muster her courage before a staff meeting, but she nonetheless lashes out at Ray for his deception.

Over drinks with Liz, Eddie and Jane argue about Dr. Charles' "new cow" theory. At home she tells him she has to believe the theory because otherwise she fears men don't leave women - just her. Eddie comforts her, saying Ray is not the last man she'll ever love, and they fall asleep together.

In the morning, Jane says that while Eddie can be kind, his true self will inevitably come out and hurt her. Jane's brother-in-law calls with the news that her sister, who has been trying desperately to have a child, has had a miscarriage. Jane visits them and is deeply moved by her brother-in-law's love and devotion for his wife. She calls Diane and tells her she booked Dr. Charles for a telephone interview.

On the day of the interview, Jane decides to hang up the phone and admit on stage that she is the source of the article and that Dr. Charles does not exist. She calls her own theory ridiculous and says men are more nuanced than she gave them credit for. She realizes the depth of her feelings for Eddie and, discovering he's left the studio, chases after him. She finds him on the sidewalk and admits she was wrong and has fallen in love with him. They kiss passionately.

== Cast ==
- Ashley Judd as Jane Goodale, a television show producer who researches love and the problems men have with giving it
- Greg Kinnear as Ray Brown, Jane's ex-boyfriend and the show's executive producer
- Hugh Jackman as Eddie Alden, Jane's womanizing coworker and roommate
- Marisa Tomei as Liz, Jane's best friend
- Ellen Barkin as Diane Roberts, the star talent of Jane's show
- Catherine Dent as Alice, Jane's sister
- Peter Friedman as Stephen, Alice's husband
- Laura Regan as Evelyn
- Donna Hanover as Mary Lou Corkle
- Nicole Leach as Nia
- Colleen Camp as Realtor
- Julie Kavner as Furry Animal (voice)
- Sabine Singh as Girl in Bar
- Shuler Hensley as Hick Farmer
- Mireille Enos as Yoga Instructor #1
- Veronica Webb as herself
- Naomi Judd as Makeup Artist
- Hugh Downs as himself (uncredited)
- Tony Goldwyn as narrator on TV (uncredited)
- Chris Kerson as New Year's Eve Party Guest (uncredited)
- Krysten Ritter as Model (uncredited)

== Reception ==
The film opened at No. 2 at the North American box office earning $10,010,600 in its opening weekend, behind Spy Kids. Overall, the movie grossed over $38,689,940 worldwide.

=== Critical response ===
On Rotten Tomatoes, the film has an approval rating of 42% based on reviews from 118 critics. The site's consensus was "A light and predictable, if somewhat shallow, romantic comedy that's easy to sit through because of the charming leads." On Metacritic, it has a score of 32% based on reviews from 30 critics, indicating "generally unfavorable reviews". Audiences surveyed by CinemaScore gave the film a grade B on scale of A to F.

Peter Travers of Rolling Stone gave the film a positive review, saying "Judd shines like gold dust" and Jackman is "funny and touching" and "His scenes with the dazzling Judd have a poignancy that soars above the chick-flick herd into the realm of sweet magic."

Todd McCarthy of Variety called it "A romantic comedy as lamely generic as its title."
