= Freak Talks About Sex =

- alternate DVD cover
- Directed by: Paul Todisco
- Written by: Michael M.B. Galvin; Peter Speakman; Paul Todisco
- Produced by: Jimmy Daddabbo; Angela Daddabbo
- Starring: Steve Zahn; Josh Hamilton; David Kinney; Wayne Federman; Heather McComb; Arabella Field
- Cinematography: Douglas W. Shannon
- Edited by: Hiroshige Ichioka
- Music by: Pete Snell
- Distributed by: Lions Gate
- Release date: 1999
- Running time: 90 minutes
- Country: United States
- Language: English

Freak Talks About Sex, released for home video as Blowin' Smoke (its working title was Syracuse Muse), is a 1999 film starring Steve Zahn and Josh Hamilton. The movie was shot in Auburn and Syracuse, New York. It deals with issues such as love, sex, life after college, and living in a medium-sized city, in this case Syracuse.

== Plot ==
Dave Keenan (Josh Hamilton) left Syracuse for a new life in Arizona. When that did not work out, he moved back to Syracuse. He works a dead-end job at a department store in a mall, his car has broken down (and the mechanic is taking forever to fix it) and his ex-girlfriend (Arabella Field) wants him to join her in New York City. To make matters more complicated, one of his co-workers, a high school girl named Nichole (Heather McComb) seems to be getting romantically interested in him. His best friend Freak (Steve Zahn) is around for him to hang out with and offer such choice philosophical observations, like "I can't think of a single movie that couldn't be improved by a lesbian sex scene." Dave is stuck in a rut and has to decide what to do with his life.

== Soundtrack ==
1. Tugboat Annie – "Stay Inside"
2. The Wrench – "Girl"
3. Scary Chicken – "Favorite Channel"
4. Chic – "Le Freak"
5. The Tortillas You Wanted – "Girls and Cars"
6. Blondie – "Heart of Glass"
