= The Forest People =

Classic ethnographic study of Mbuti pygmies

- Author: Colin Turnbull
- Language: English
- Subject: Anthropology
- Genre: Non-fiction
- Set in: Africa
- Publisher: Simon & Schuster
- Publication date: 1961
- ISBN: 0671266500

The Forest People (1961) is Colin Turnbull's ethnographic study of the Mbuti pygmies of the Ituri Forest in what was then the Belgian Congo.

In this book, the British-American anthropologist detailed his three years spent with the community in the mid 1950s. The style is informal and accessible. Turnbull contrasts his forest-living subjects' lifestyle with that of nearby town-dwelling Africans and evaluates the interactions of the two groups.

The editor for the book was Michael Korda who attended Oxford University with Turnbull.

The Forest People was the version for a general readership of Turnbull's academic thesis, which was published in an expanded, more technical form by Routledge in London as Wayward Servants: The Two Worlds of the African Pygmies (1965). Turnbull wrote about his experiences with the tribe from a first person perspective. The Mbuti tribe respected him, and attempted to show him their cultural prospects as a society until a drastic change in their lifestyles occurred.
