= Tugboat Annie (band) =

American rock band

Tugboat Annie is an American rock band. Formed in Buffalo, New York in 1990, Tugboat Annie was composed of bassist Jon Sulkow, guitarist Mike Bethmann, guitarist Jim Brown (see "Damn the Man," later replaced by Jay Celeste), and drummer Tim Barrett (replaced in Boston by former Mighty Mighty Bosstones drummer Josh Dalsimer). Tim Barrett has since returned to the band.

Early experiments included a live show at the University at Buffalo's WRUB.Tugboat Annie became a staple of the early '90s Buffalo scene, playing with bands like Milf at venues like the (pre-fire) Continental and Nietzsche's.

The band began practicing and playing shows again in 2019, incorporating several new songs into live shows.

"Stay Inside" plays over the opening credits of the Josh Hamilton-Steve Zahn film Freak Talks About Sex. It also plays over the main menu for the film's DVD.

"More" was chosen as background music for a Monster.com commercial in 2001.

== Discography ==
- 1991: "Knuckle Sammich" (self-released; cassette with hand-rendered illustration). Includes "Souvlaki Rodeo."
- 1991: "El Mar" (self-released; cassette, produced by Robby Takac).
- 1993: "Stay Inside" (Sonic Bubblegum; 7" split w/ Crazy Alice).
- 1994: "Nine More" and "Try" (Cash Cow; 7" split w/ Milf).
- 1995: "Jack Knife" b/w "Mock" (Sonic Bubblegum; 7").
- 1995: "Superfriends" (Sonic Bubblegum #22; CD; produced by John C. Wood; Denise appears on the cover). Released March 24.
- 1996: "Posterboy" b/w "Competition for Scarce Resources" (Sonic Bubblegum; 7").
- 1997: "Wake Up and Disappear" (Big Top Records; CD and cassette). Released April 22.
- 1998: "Separation Songs" (Kimchee/Big Top Records; CD and cassette). Written during the "Wake Up" tour and released in April.
- 2000: "The Space Around You" (Big Top Records; CD).
