= An Answer from Limbo =

1962 novel by Brian Moore

- First edition
- Author: Brian Moore
- Language: English
- Genre: Novel
- Publisher: Atlantic/ Little, Brown
- Publication date: 1962
- Publication place: United States
- Preceded by: The Luck of Ginger Coffey (1960)
- Followed by: The Emperor of Ice-Cream (1965)

An Answer from Limbo is a novel by Northern Irish-Canadian writer Brian Moore, published in October 1962. It was written between November 1960 and early 1962, when Moore was living in New York.

== Plot ==
The central character in the book is Brendan Tierney, a young Irish writer living in New York City with his American wife and their two children. Tierney is working on his first novel. For him to write full-time, his wife must work; he invites his widowed mother over from Ireland to look after the children. Conflicts arise when the mother finds that her own lifestyle, values and sense of morality are at odds with what she sees in her son and daughter-in-law's home.

== Critical responses ==
Moore's biographer, Patricia Craig, says that literary ambition is the theme of An Answer from Limbo, "which - with great economy – draws on his New York experience to encapsulate the ruthlessnes of the writer hell-bent in securing a niche for himself, overriding every obstacle on the road to celebrity."

Robert Fulford, writing in Canada's The Globe and Mail, describes it as "a dazzlingly good story about a young novelist's angry need to write a masterpiece".

According to Denis Sampson it is "a novel about marital dissatisfaction that develops into a moral fable because the dilemmas in which these characters find themselves mirror a society in spiritual and cultural crisis".

eNotes describes An Answer from Limbo as "Moore’s most disturbing as well as one of his finest novels. The book is about cultural alienation, as Mrs. Tierney finds herself uprooted from her Irish Catholic norms in the secular wasteland of North America. It is about the emotional limbo in which Jane is cast, as she realizes that her husband and children do not love her, nor she them. It is, above all, about the consequences of a dehumanizing obsession, a private ambition that ends up ruining the writer as well as those around him."

DeWitt Henry describes An Answer from Limbo as a "a minor classic" and says "All that's best in Moore is pushed to the limit here: dramatic access to manifold points of view, masterfully differentiated by style and sensibility, and in the tragic (and comic) distances between them somehow comprehensive in reference... Add also clarity and complexity of plot, strong narrative drive, the "world" of New York, and the overall sense of vital issues at stake: but most of all Moore's genius for constantly pushing decorums over the edge into "unimaginable" extremity... Moore's sense of probability has never seemed more deeply, bravely, widely knowing than our own, nor as clear-eyed, nor as fair."
