= Joseph Towles =

African American anthropologist (1937 – 1988)

- Born: August 17, 1937
- Died: 19 December 1988 (aged 51)
- Partner: Colin Turnbull (m. 1959)

Academic work
- Discipline: Anthropologist
- Sub-discipline: Social anthropology; slavery; African studies

Joseph Allen Towles (August 17, 1937 – December 19, 1988) was an African American anthropologist and author of the books Nkumbi Initiation and Asa: Myth of Origin of the Blood Brotherhood Among the Mbo of the Ituri Forest. Towles was born in Senora, Virginia, to Arcellius Towles and Lucy Blair and was raised in Virginia before moving to New York City to pursue acting. He graduated with an undergraduate degree in anthropology from Pace University, and received a Ph.D. from Makerere University in Uganda. His life partner was Colin Turnbull, who created an archive of Towles' papers after his death.

== Career ==
Towles was a volunteer in the Anthropology department at the American Museum of Natural History, where he assisted in the creation of the "Man in Africa Hall," later called the "Hall of African Peoples" from 1965 to 1967. Towles is credited with developing sections of the exhibit on African American enslavement, the African experience in the Americas, and Egyptian history. According to In the Arms of Africa, Towles' work on "Man in Africa Hall" gave the exhibit greater staying power by including Egypt, which was typically included in Middle Eastern studies rather than African studies at the time. The exhibit was one of the first in the United States to situate the study of Egypt within Africa rather than the Middle East. Towles also researched and constructed the "Slavery in the New World" section of the museum.

Turnbull and Towles spent time in Africa conducting anthropological fieldwork with the Ik, Mbuti, and Mbo peoples.

== Personal life ==
Towles met British anthropologist Colin Turnbull in 1959 while living in New York. They took wedding vows in 1960 and "considered themselves to be married as husband and wife". In 1967, Turnbull and Towles built an estate in Lancaster County, Virginia, called Chestnut Point; they lived "openly as a gay, interracial couple in one of the smallest and most conservative rural towns in Virginia". Towles had numerous affairs, was an alcoholic, and died of AIDS in 1988.

== Selected works ==
- Towles, Joseph A. (1993). Nkumbi initiation: ritual and structure among the Mbo of Zaïre. Tervuren: Musée royal de l'Afrique Centrale.
- Towles, Joseph A. (1993). Asa: myth of origin of blood-brotherhood among the Mbo, Ituri Forest. Tervuren: Musée royal de l'Afrique Centrale.
