= Laura Zigman =

American novelist

Laura Zigman is an American novelist and freelance journalist who lives outside Boston, Massachusetts. She is the author of the novels Animal Husbandry, Dating Big Bird, Her, Piece of Work, Separation Anxiety, and Small World. She is co-author with professional matchmaker Patti Novak of the self-help book Get Over Yourself: How to Get Real, Get Serious, and Get Ready to Find True Love.

== Career ==
Zigman grew up in Newton, Massachusetts, and graduated from the University of Massachusetts Amherst. She worked for ten years in New York City as a publicist for Times Books, Vintage Books, Turtle Bay Books, Atlantic Monthly Press, and Alfred A. Knopf, before moving to Washington, D.C., and beginning a career as a writer. Her first novel was Animal Husbandry (1998), which was made into the 2001 romantic comedy Someone Like You, starring Ashley Judd and Hugh Jackman. Her 2006 novel Piece of Work (described in USA Today as "one part pleasant, one part unoriginal") was optioned for a movie screenplay by Tom Hanks's Playtone.

In about 2006 after her second, third, and fourth novels (unlike her highly successful first novel) "tanked" and Zigman moved from Washington to the Boston area, where she was battling breast cancer and caring for her son and her two dying parents, Zigman "pivoted" from writing her own novels to working as a ghostwriter. Books on which she collaborated included British comedian and actor Eddie Izzard's 2017 autobiography Believe Me and Texas politician Wendy Davis's 2014 memoir Forgetting to be Afraid. Ghostwriting enabled Zigman to make a living, but with it, she complained in 2020, "you lose your voice." Zigman later resumed writing her own novels; she wrote her fifth, Separation Anxiety, which was published in 2020, over three-and-a-half years "in between ghostwriting projects."

She is often described as a writer of chick lit, and described herself as "heartbroken, urban, single, postfeminist", which prompted her to write so other people would know that "I am not the only loser in the world who feels lonely". Her books have been characterized as breezy, clever, engaging and naughty, with reviewers comparing her style to that of novelists Olivia Goldsmith and Fay Weldon. In addition to writing novels and non-fiction books, she is an irregular contributor to The New York Times and The Huffington Post, and creator of a series of Xtranormal videoclips, which she publishes on her blog.

== Personal life ==
Zigman battled breast cancer in 2006-2007. She is married and has a son, and lives with her family in Cambridge, Massachusetts.

== Publications ==
=== Novels ===
- Animal Husbandry (1997)
- Dating Big Bird (1999)
- Her (2003)
- Piece of Work (2006)
- Separation Anxiety (2020)
- Small World (2023)
- The Author Weekend (2026) ISBN 9798228330405

=== Nonfiction ===
- Patti Novak and Laura Zigman, Get Over Yourself!: How to Get Real, Get Serious, and Get Ready to Find True Love (2008)
- Eddie Izzard with Laura Zigman, Believe Me: A Memoir of Love, Death, and Jazz Chickens (2017)

=== Selected Articles ===
- "Living Off-Center on Purpose", The New York Times (Dec. 12, 1996)
- "Got Hitched And Suddenly Dating Is Really Hard", The New York Times (March 12, 2000)
- "The Writing Life: How (Not) To Become a Writer", The Washington Post (Sep. 3, 2006)
- "Caring for Two Generations Almost Cost Me My Career", The New York Times (Feb. 11, 2020)
