= The Morning After Girls =

Australian neo-psychedelia band

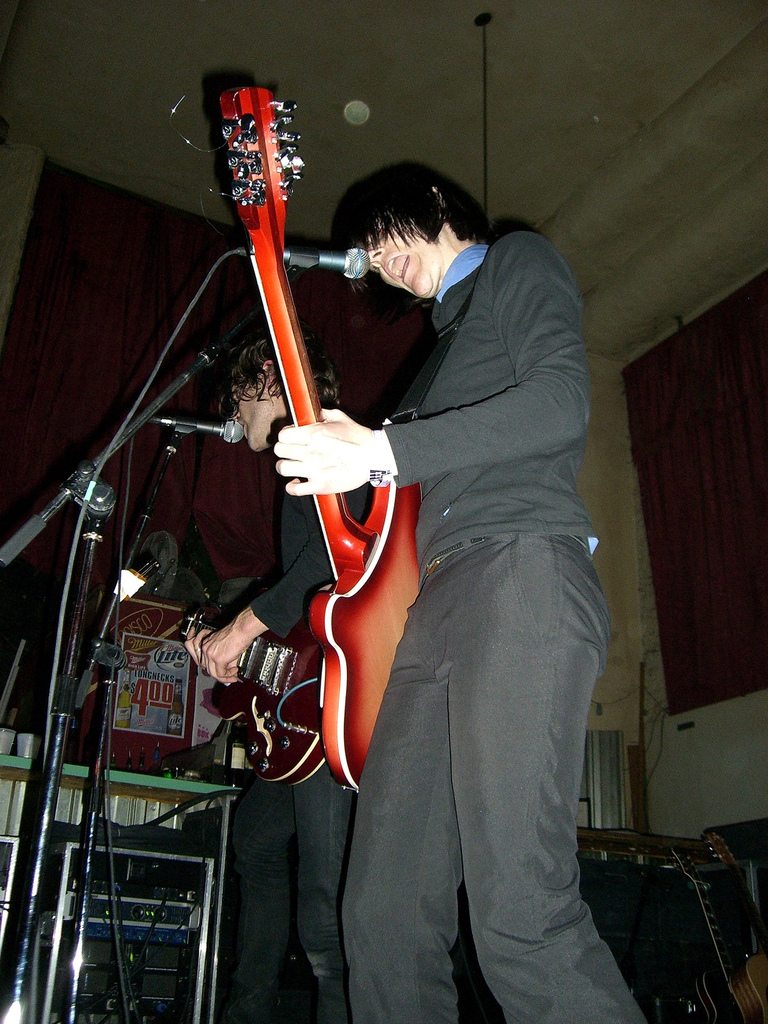
- The Morning After Girls - Live concert in 2006

Background information
- Origin: Melbourne, Australia
- Genres: Psychedelic rock; alternative rock
- Years active: 2003–Current
- Labels: ABC, Xemu, Tee Pee, Cargo, Best Before Records, Rainbow Quartz, Rubber, Fly
- Members: Sacha Lucashenko; Joseph Dwyer; Alister Morley; Peter Haren
- Past members: Martin B. Sleeman; EJ Hagen; John Brodeur; Alexander White; Anthony Johnson; Anton Jakovljevic; Aimee Nash; Scott Von Ryper; Michael Stranges; Lucia Di Mauro; Dr Karl Bartl; Ricardo Zrna; Andrew Cowie

The Morning After Girls are an Australian neo-psychedelic band. The group was originally formed in Melbourne, Victoria around 2003 by founding members Sacha Lucashenko (vocals and guitar) and Martin B. Sleeman (vocals and guitar), who relocated the group to New York City in 2008. Its American lineup included Alexander White (keyboards, percussion, backing vocals), EJ Hagen (bass guitar), and John Brodeur (drums). They returned to live performances in Australia in 2017. A new full-length album scheduled for 2022 was announced on LA's KCRW.

== History ==
The group released two EPs, the first on Rubber Records in 2003 and the second on Fly Music in early 2005, both of which were self-titled. On 20 September 2005, the band released its two EPs as one CD in North America entitled The Morning After Girls: Prelude EPs 1 & 2. This album was also released as Shadows Evolve on 17 November 2005 in Australia and 16 June 2005 in the UK through the London independent label Best Before Records. Mark Gardener of Ride contributed vocals to the track "Fall Before Waking".

The band toured with Black Rebel Motorcycle Club, the Dandy Warhols, the Brian Jonestown Massacre, the Black Keys, and the Warlocks. Festival appearances included slots at the Reading Festival, Leeds Festival, T in the Park, and Oxegen Festival—2006, Homebake in 2003, 2004, and 2005, and Clean Air, Clear Stars in 2009.

After taking time to record a new album in Australia with engineer and producer Robbie Rowlands they headed to London for final mixing with producer Alan Moulder. The band released "The General Public" maxi-single exclusively through iTunes worldwide (except Australia and New Zealand). The full-length album Alone. followed on 7 July 2009 (digital only through iTunes in North America). Tee Pee Records released a limited-edition white vinyl 7" including the songs "The General Public" and "Who Is They". Following this, the band toured the US in the summer of 2009 with The Warlocks.

Alone was released on CD and LP on Xemu Records (Dead Meadow, Spindrift) on 11 January 2011 in North America and 14 March in the U.K and Europe.

The band contributed the song "Death Processions" to Tony Hawk Ride, which was released in November 2009 for Xbox 360, PlayStation 3, and Wii. In 2009, Alone appeared on 90210, and in 2010 "To Be Your Loss" appeared in The Vampire Diaries, both on the CW network.

alone in north america was released through iTunes by Hypnagogia Films on 20 January 2015.

The band returned to Australia in 2017, performing shows in Melbourne throughout the year and into 2018. They supported The Charlatans at Melbourne's 170 Russell in August 2018.

On 23 September 2021, both KEXP and KCRW’s US radio morning shows confirmed rumours from a "reliable source" that release details for the new albums (plural) will be confirmed very soon. A link was temporarily made available the same morning on InsiderMagazine.com that simply stated "things are often better in threes".

== Discography ==
=== Albums ===
- The Morning After Girls: Prelude EPs 1 & 2 (Rainbow Quartz – US only, September 2005)
- Shadows Evolve (Fly Music – Australia only; Best Before Records – UK only, CD & LP, November 2005)
- Alone. (Xemu Records – Worldwide, CD & LP, 2011)

=== EPs ===
- The Morning After Girls EP 1 (Rubber Records – Australia only, November 2003)
- The Morning After Girls EP 2 (Fly Music – Australia only, January 2005)
- The General Public (Self-released, iTunes only May 2009)

=== Singles ===
- "Hi-Skies" (Best Before Records, 3 CD versions & 7", 2005)
- "Run For Our Lives" (Best Before Records, CD & 7" June 2006)
- "Shadows Evolve" (Best Before Records, 7", November 2006)
- "Straight Thru You" (Distant Noise Records, November 2008)
- "The General Public" (Tee Pee Records, 7", July 2009)

=== Compilations ===
- Triple J: Home And Hosed - The First Harvest (ABC Music, 2003) — contributed Straight Thru You
- South By Southwest 2005 - Welcome To MTV2 Country (Music Week, 2005) — contributed Run For Our Lives
- Homebake 2005 (Promo for Homebake, 2005) — contributed Run For Our Lives
- NY2LON (Best Before Records & Filter US Recordings, 2006) — contributed Hi-Skies
- NME Presents The Best New Bands From Reading And Leeds Festivals (New Musical Express, 2006) — contributed "Always Mine"
- ASCAP/SHOUT! Vol 3 (ASCAP, 2006) — contributed "Run For Our Lives"
- He Put the Bomp! In the Bomp (Bomp Records, 2007) — contributed "The Trip"
- Rainbow Quartz 2009 Label Sampler — "Run for Our Lives"
- iTunes Indie Spotlight (2009, digital only)
- Word magazine (UK) Now Hear This! sampler (April 2011) — contributed "Alone"

=== Film ===
- alone in north america (Hypnagogia Films, 2014)

=== Video games ===
- Destroy All Humans! 2 (Lakeshore Records, 2006) — contributed "Straight Thru You"
- Tony Hawk Ride (Activision, 2009) — contributed "Death Processions"

=== Television ===
- 90210 (CW, 2009) — contributed "Alone"
- The Vampire Diaries (CW, 2010) — contributed "To Be Your Loss"
