= Shadows Evolve =

Studio album by the Morning After Girls
- Released: 2005
- Genre: Neo-psychedelia
- Label: ABC

The Morning After Girls chronology
Shadows Evolve (2005)	Alone. (2011)

Professional ratings
Review scores
Source	Rating
AllMusic	3/5 stars
Drowned in Sound	6/10 stars
MusicOMH	5/5 stars

Shadows Evolve (also known as evolve.) is the debut studio album by Australian neo-psychedelia band the Morning After Girls, released in 2005.

== Track listing ==
No.	Title	Length
1.	"Introduction"	1:21
2.	"Shadows Evolve"	4:16
3.	"Run for Our Lives"	3:05
4.	"Hidden Spaces"	3:18
5.	"Always Mine"	4:24
6.	"Lazy Greys"	3:48
7.	"Straight Thru You"	2:57
8.	"Fireworks"	2:32
9.	"Interlude"	2:37
10.	"Fall Before Walking"	3:48
11.	"Slowdown"	3:58
12.	"Hi-Skies"	3:49
13.	"Chasing Us Under"	4:48
