= The Luck of Ginger Coffey (film) =

- DVD cover
- Directed by: Irvin Kershner
- Written by: Brian Moore
- Produced by: Leon Roth
- Starring: Robert Shaw; Mary Ure
- Cinematography: Manny Wynn
- Edited by: Antony Gibbs
- Music by: Bernardo Segall
- Production company: Crawley Films
- Distributed by: Continental Distributing Inc.
- Release date: 1964
- Running time: 100 minutes
- Country: Canada
- Language: English
- Budget: $500,000

The Luck of Ginger Coffey is a 1964 Canadian film directed by Irvin Kershner. It is based on the Governor General's Award-winning novel by Northern Irish-Canadian writer Brian Moore, published in 1960.

== Plot ==
The Luck of Ginger Coffey is about James Francis Coffey, a 39-year-old Irishman who is called "Ginger" because of his reddish hair and moustache. He is unfulfilled career-wise, no matter which job he takes on. After his release from the Army, he and his wife Vera, together with their 14-year-old daughter Paulie, move to Montreal.

In Canada, Coffey still has trouble finding work. Vera gets very upset when she finds out that Ginger is still unemployed and has spent their ticket money home.

However broke and empty-hearted they may be, they do have one friend to count on in Canada: Joe McGlade, who helps Coffey get a job working as a proofreader at the newspaper where McGlade is employed as a sports reporter. Coffey is unimpressed once again and continues to tell Vera it will all get better, but she has her own plans for improving her life. She leaves Coffey for McGlade and takes Paulie with her. She also takes all of Coffey's money and most of his belongings. Coffey gets a small place at the YMCA, and during his stay there he accepts a job previously offered (and refused) as a diaper delivery driver.

Coffey finds this job even more repulsive than his current one but takes it anyway, with a plan in mind: To get back Paulie and impress Vera with his selflessness. Vera is still unconvinced, but Paulie turns to her father's side and they get a flat of their own. Coffey is obsessed with Vera and begins to get sick from lack of sleep and food and an excessive work schedule. He is also obsessed with being promoted to reporter so that Vera will take him back, but unfortunately she only brings up the topic of divorce.

After turning down a promising promotion at the diaper service, Ginger discovers that the reporter's job he believes he was offered never existed, and was vaguely promised to prevent his quitting and leaving the department short staffed. Enraged, Ginger engages in a scuffle in the editor's office, and is escorted from the premises, presumably fired. Later, after drinks with his former co-workers, Ginger relieves himself in an alley beside a hotel, and is arrested and charged with indecent exposure, the charges later dropped by a sympathetic judge, after a humiliating, albeit short trial, witnessed by Vera.

Vera and Ginger meet outside the courthouse, as she is preparing to leave on a skiing trip with Joe McGlade. In sympathy, Vera accepts Ginger's invitation to have a cup of coffee, and there Ginger admits his shortcomings, and that he considers himself and his life as a joke. Vera then becomes the optimist, and as Ginger walks her home, she assures Ginger his promotion at the diaper service will likely still be available. Vera enters her flat, leaving the door open, as an invitation for Ginger to enter as well. Ginger enters, as the closing credits roll.

== Cast ==
- Robert Shaw as Ginger Coffey
- Mary Ure as Vera Coffey
- Liam Redmond as MacGregor
- Tom Harvey as Joe McGlade
- Libby McClintock as Paulie Coffey
- Leo Leyden as Brott
- Powys Thomas as Fox
- Tom Kneebone as Kenny
- Leslie Yeo as Stan Mountain
- Vernon Chapman as Hawkins

== Production ==
The film, which cost just over its budget of $500,000, was largely financed by executive producer Budge Crawley.

=== Casting ===
British co-stars Robert Shaw and Mary Ure were real-life husband and wife.

=== Filming ===
It was filmed in Montreal and Ottawa.

== Reception ==
Writing in The New York Times, Bosley Crowther said: "Brian Moore's screenplay, written from his novel, is firm in structure and dialogue and an air of reality is given to it by dandy location shooting in Montreal... there is a subtle, important relation between the temperature of [Irving Kershner, the director's] snowy streets and the piteous progression of coldness between the husband and the wife."

Stanley Kauffmann of The New Republic wrote that The Luck of Ginger Coffey "has neither depth of character nor point".
