= Zigmas =

Zigmas is a Lithuanian masculine given name. Notable people with the name include:

- Zigmas Jukna (1935–1980), Lithuanian rower who competed for the Soviet Union
- Zigmas Vaišvila (born 1956), Lithuanian politician
- Zigmas Zinkevičius (1925–2018), Lithuanian linguist-historian
