= The Luck of Ginger Coffey (novel) =

1960 novel by Brian Moore

- First US edition
- Author: Brian Moore
- Genre: Fiction
- Publisher: Andre Deutsch (UK); The Atlantic Monthly (US)
- Publication date: 1960
- Media type: Print
- Pages: 243
- OCLC: 367113
- Preceded by: Murder in Majorca (as Michael Bryan) (1957)
- Followed by: An Answer from Limbo (1962)

The Luck of Ginger Coffey, a novel by Northern Irish-Canadian writer Brian Moore, was published in 1960, in the United States by The Atlantic Monthly and in the United Kingdom by Andre Deutsch. In Canada, it received a Governor General's Award. The book was made into a film, directed by Irvin Kershner, and released in 1964. Robert Shaw starred in the title role.

== Plot ==
Encyclopaedia Britannica describes The Luck of Ginger Coffey as being about an "Irish-born Canadian immigrant whose self-deluded irresponsible behaviour nearly breaks up his family".

The book's protagonist, James Francis Coffey, is called "Ginger" because of his reddish hair and moustache. He is unfulfilled in his career, no matter which job he takes. After his release from the Army, he and his wife, Veronica, together with their daughter Paulie, move to Montreal.

In Canada, Coffey still has trouble finding work. Veronica gets very upset when she finds out that Ginger is still unemployed and has spent their ticket money home.

However broke and empty-hearted they may be, they do have one friend to count on in Canada: Gerry Grosvenor, who helps Coffey get a job working as a proofreader at a newspaper. Coffey is unimpressed once again and continues to tell Veronica it will all get better, but Veronica has her own plans for improving her life in Canada. She leaves Coffey for Grosvenor and takes Paulie with her. She also takes all of Coffey's money and most of his belongings. Coffey gets a small place at the YMCA, and during his stay there he encounters a man who offers him a diaper delivery and pick-up job.

Coffey finds this job even more repulsive than his current one but takes it anyway, with a plan in mind: To get back at Paulie and impress Veronica with his selflessness. Veronica is still unconvinced, but Paulie turns to her father's side and they get a flat of their own. Coffey is obsessed with Veronica and begins to get sick from lack of sleep and food and an excessive work schedule. He is also obsessed with being promoted to reporter so that Veronica will take him back, but unfortunately she only brings up the topic of divorce. After many drunk excursions, fist fights with Gerry, a run-in with the police and promotion battles, Veronica finally sees how hard Ginger is working and fighting for her, and at the moment when he finally decides to let her go she sees just how much he really loves her.

== Reception ==
When the book was published in 1960, Kirkus Reviews described Coffey as a "somewhat jauntier figure" than the protagonists in Moore's previous two books. "If Ginger has learned to compromise, so too has Brian Moore, and this third book, with its tempered finale, is less devastating than the earlier ones."
