= Ik people =

Ethnic group in northeastern Uganda

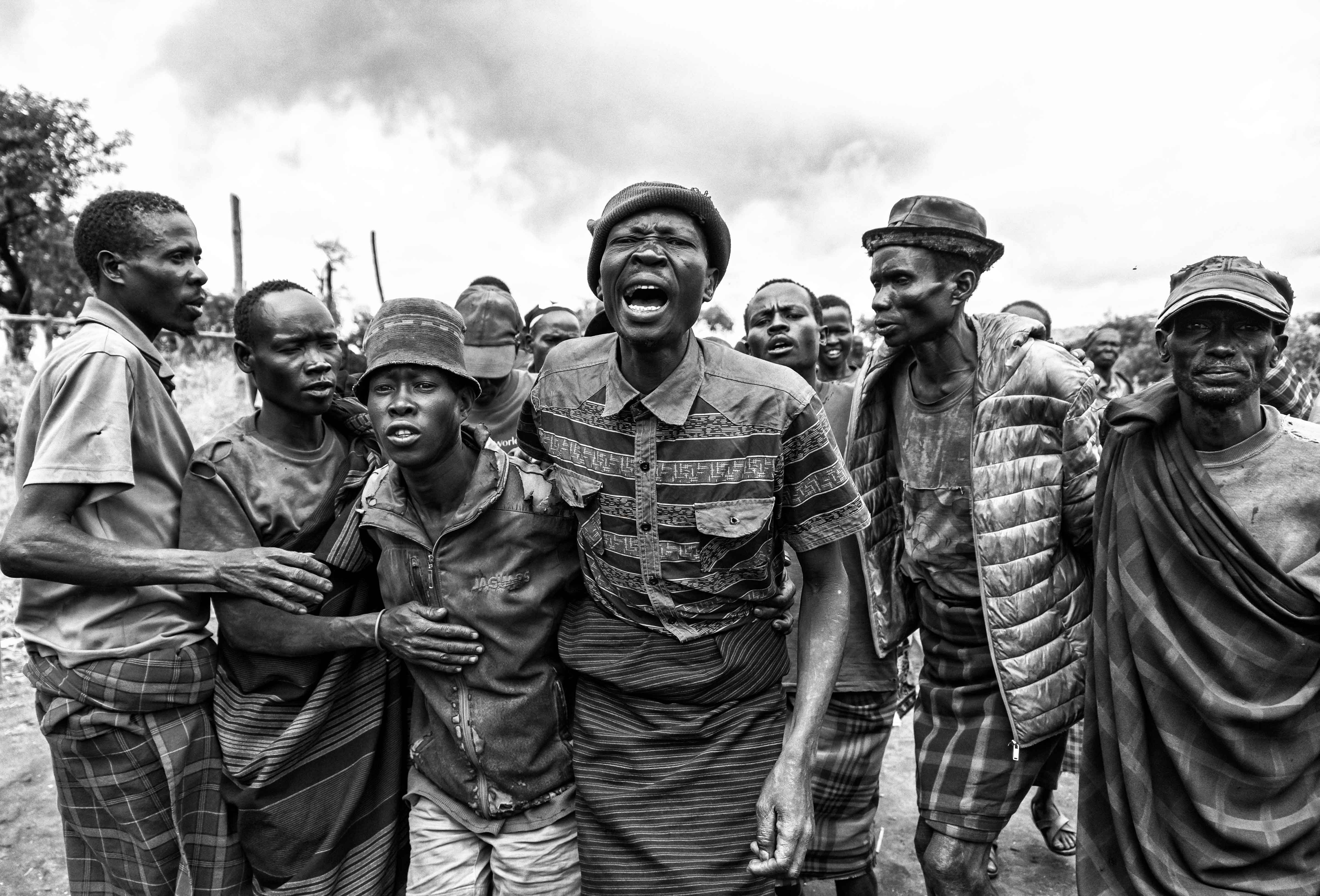
- Ik people in Eastern Uganda, 2020

Total population
- 16,000

Languages
- Ik

Religion
- Catholicism

The Ik people are an ethnic group or tribe native to northeastern Uganda, near the Kenyan border. Primarily subsistence farmers, most Ik live in small clan villages, or odoks, in the area surrounding Mount Morungole in the Kaabong district. Their population is estimated between 10,000 and 15,000. The word Ik means "head of migration"; they are traditionally believed by locals to have been some of the region's earliest settlers from Kenya.

The Ik language is a member of the Kuliak sub-group of Nilo-Saharan languages. Notable traditions include itówé-és ("blessing the seeds"), a three-day festival that marks the beginning of the agricultural year, and ipéyé-és, a coming-of-age ritual in which young men must cleanly slaughter a male goat with a spear. The Ik are predominantly Christian.

The Ik, along with various other Ugandan tribes, have been subject to forced eviction from their ancestral lands without compensation. They continue to face numerous challenges due to their small population and isolation. The road system in rural Kaabong is poor, and access to education and health services is scarce: in 2016, only one Ik student completed their O-level examinations. In 2016, Hillary Lokwang became the first member of the tribe to be elected to parliament; however, they continue to be politically marginalized. Due to their reliance on agriculture, they are vulnerable to drought and famine. The tribe is considered endangered by some.

In 1972, they were the subject of anthropologist Colin Turnbull's highly contested book The Mountain People, which described a culture of extreme individualism in which love and altruism were virtually unknown. Later ethnographic research has challenged that portrayal and instead portrays a society characterized by generosity.

== Communities and culture ==
The Ik are divided into patrilineal clans, of which Heine in 1985 noted twelve. Clans are led by the J’akama Awae, an inherited position. Marriages between members of different clans occur; in these cases, according to Heine, women retain their original clan identity, while their children are born members of the father's clan. Clans live in small, walled villages known as odoks or asaks. Ik villages may be visited by tourists.

=== Rituals ===
There are known rituals in Ik culture, the most significant of which are ipéyé-és and tasapet. Both are considered rites of passage and are practiced by only men: ipéyé-és marks the beginning of manhood, and tasapet the initiation to elderhood. In ipéyé-és, young men must slaughter a male goat instantaneously, using a spear that may not penetrate the other side of the goat's body. Tasapet may not be completed by a man until all of his older brothers have gone through it. Once this has occurred, his hair will be shaved and he will be taken to live in the bush for a month, as well as slaughtering a bull. Men who have completed tasapet are considered the highest members of the Ik: no decisions can be made without their consent, and they are entitled to respect from those younger. As of 1985, this tradition may be endangered due to the expense of purchasing cattle from neighboring groups.

=== Marriage ===
Marriage is generally arranged between families, and engagements may be decided when the bride is as young as seven to ten years old. The groom's family is expected to pay a bride price; the groom is obligated to work for the bride's family for a period. The first marriage ceremony is called tsan-es, in which the engaged are rubbed with oil. The groom then throws a spear at a tree, in order to test his abilities as a hunter. Following this, the bride is expected to cook and perform domestic duties for the groom's clan, while they assess her ability to integrate among them. In the second ceremony, the groom's family visits the bride bearing livestock and grain. They are welcomed with beer and any remaining problems between the two families are discussed. After a few days of celebration, the bride returns with the groom's family. In subsequent ceremonies, the groom is expected to provide food or beer to various other members of the clan, in order to help integrate the newlyweds into society.

=== Holidays ===
Three major holidays were noted by Heine in his report, the most important of which is itówé-és, or “blessing of the seeds.” The holiday is celebrated over three days, generally in January, and marks the beginning of the agricultural season. On the first day of the holiday, a sacred tree is planted and people bring their seeds to be blessed under it, which includes dancing around the tree. Beer is brewed, and the following morning elder members taste it, after which it is drunk. No individual may drink until all older members of the tribe have done so first. Dzíber-ika mεs, or “beer of the axes”, is the second most important Ik holiday. Beer is brewed by individual families and brought to the di, the meeting place of the elders, along with all their agricultural tools. The beer is drunk and then sprinkled over the tools to bless them. It is usually celebrated in November or December. Inúmúm-έs, or “opening the harvest”, is celebrated around August. Harvested grains are cooked communally and eaten by the men at the di.

=== Generosity ===
Turnbull's 1972 ethnography described the Ik as "unfriendly, uncharitable, inhospitable and generally mean as any people can be." This perception of the Ik was reflected in other publications, including The New York Times, who described the Ik as a "haunting flower of evil." A twenty-first century report by Cathryn Townsend of Baylor University, however, fully repudiated these claims. Using the Dictator Game, a common anthropological test, the Ik demonstrated generosity on par with most other cultures. The Ik believe in nature spirits called kíʝáwika, which reward generosity. According to Townsend, Turnbull's perception of the Ik may have been partly due to the famine the group was experiencing at the time.

A habitually peaceful people, the Ik are frequently raided by neighboring tribes. They have a ritual dance in which they practice responding to an attack, in which the men defend the village and women help lead children to hidden positions, as well as caring for wounded.

== Livelihood ==
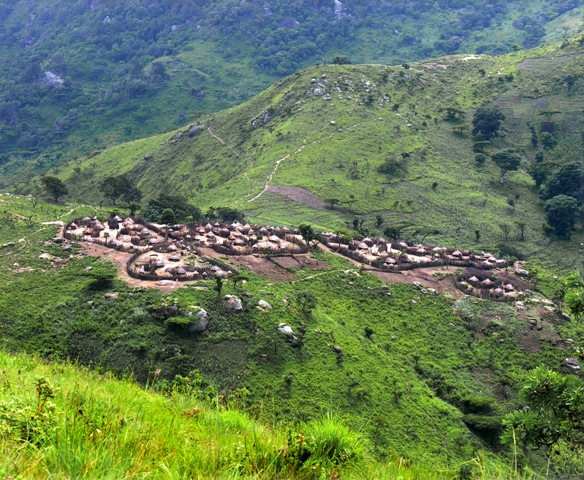
Ik village in northern Uganda, 2005

The Ik are primarily subsistence farmers. Their staple crops include sorghum, millet, corn and tobacco. Their diets are supplemented with hunting as well as gathering of certain foods, including honey, various fruits and white ants, known as danj. They may trade with neighboring groups for products such as cattle. The Ik are known to brew beer, and the drink plays an important role in some of their traditions.

== The Mountain People ==
In 1972, anthropologist Colin Turnbull published an ethnography about the Ik, The Mountain People. The research provides an examination of Ik culture based on his fieldwork during a drought and famine in 1965–66. He depicts the Ik as a people forced into radical individualism to survive, such that they take no care or responsibility for others, sharing nothing, never cooperating on anything, and treating the elderly, infirm and even their own children as little more than burdens. He relies on the few surviving elderly Ik as sources for describing the earlier, less dysfunctional Ik society, including hunter-gatherer practices, marriage, childbirth, death rituals/taboos, and religion.

Turnbull records his horror at many of the events he witnesses, such as their disregard for familial bonds, leading to the death of children and the elderly by starvation. He writes warmly about certain Ik, and describes his "misguided" efforts to give food and water to those too weak to farm or forage, standing guard over them to prevent others from stealing their food. The book raises questions about human nature, and the abandonment of love and altruism in time of severe hardship; it also suggests parallels to the individualism of Western society. His time with the Ik exasperated Turnbull and aggravated his innate melancholy, yet he dedicated his work "to the Ik, whom I learned not to hate".

Given the Ik's subsistence crisis and (apparent) cultural collapse, Turnbull advocated to the Ugandan government that the tribe be broken up and resettled "with no more than ten people in any re-located group" to alleviate the Ik tendency of alienating their neighbors.

=== Criticism ===
Turnbull's research is controversial among other researchers, who question the accuracy of many 'vivid' claims by his study subjects. In 1983, Bernd Heine argued that Turnbull's methods and conclusions were flawed:

- Evidence indicates Turnbull possessed limited knowledge of the rapidly-evolving Ik language and tradition and virtually no knowledge of the flora and fauna of the region. He asserted the Ik had been hunter-gatherers but were forced to learn farming after being expelled from their homeland by the formation of Kidepo National Park. However, linguistic and cultural evidence suggests that the Ik had been farmers long before that displacement.
- Some of Turnbull's informants were not Ik but Diding'a, including Turnbull's translator, named Lomeja, who Heine claimed spoke a broken form of Ik. Moreover, half of the six villages Turnbull studied were headed by non-Ik.
- Turnbull's claim of extensive Ik cattle stealing is contradicted by official government reports.
- Heine's own research contradicted Turnbull's claim of frequent non-monogamy among the Ik; during the two years Turnbull stayed among them, there was only one documented instance of non-monogamous sexual activity.

Heine concluded, "...Turnbull's account of Ik culture turned out to be at variance with most observations we made - to the extent that at times I was under the impression that I was dealing with an entirely different people." Heine endorsed the conclusion of T.O. Beidelman:

This book cannot be discussed in any proper sociological terms, for we are provided with only snatches of data. Rather than being a study of the Ik, this is an autobiographical portrait of the author using the Ik as counters for expressing his personal feelings and experiences in the field.

=== Cultural references ===
Turnbull's book provided material for a 1975 play called The Ik by Colin Higgins and Dennis Cannan. Directed by Peter Brook, the play premiered in Paris in 1975, and was produced in London in 1976 by the Royal Shakespeare Company. The group toured the United States in 1976 as a bi-centennial gift from French tax-payers.

The physician and poet Lewis Thomas wrote an essay, "The Ik", which Cevin Soling read as a child and sparked a documentary, Ikland (2011). It was produced in the mid-2000s by Spectacle Films and was directed by Soling and David Hilbert. The film depicts the Ik people in a positive light by showing how easily befriended they are, how they survive and live as families, their music and dancing, and their ability to step into acting roles. The documentary concludes with members of the tribe mimicking a staged performance of A Christmas Carol by Charles Dickens as a Western metaphor for 'redemption'.
