= Alone (The Morning After Girls album) =

Alone.

Studio album by The Morning After Girls
- Released: 2011
- Genre: Neo-psychedelia
- Length: 51:05
- Label: Xemu

The Morning After Girls chronology
Shadows Evolve (2005)	Alone. (2011)

Alone. is the second studio album by Australian neo-psychedelia band The Morning After Girls.

"Alone" was released as a free download on Spinner.com.

== Track listing ==
All tracks are written by Sacha Lucashenko and Martin B. Sleeman, except where noted

No.	Title	Writer(s)	Length
1.	"A New Silence"		0:32
2.	"The Best Explanation"		3:56
3.	"The General Public"		3:36
4.	"Alone"		4:44
5.	"Death Processions"	Joseph Dwyer, Sacha Lucashenko and Martin B. Sleeman	5:37
6.	"Part of Your Nature"		5:00
7.	"You Need to Die"		4:26
8.	"To Be Your Loss"		3:20
9.	"There's a Taking"		2:58
10.	"Still Falling"		4:22
11.	"Who Is They"	Joseph Dwyer, Sacha Lucashenko and Martin B. Sleeman	5:35
12.	"Tomorrow's Time"		6:59

== Critical reception ==
Professional ratings
Review scores
Source	Rating
The Mercury	4/5 stars

The Mercury called Alone. "skilful, intricate and drenched in grandeur".
