= The Emperor of Ice-Cream (novel) =

1965 novel by Brian Moore

- First edition
- Author: Brian Moore
- Language: English
- Genre: Bildungsroman
- Publisher: McClelland and Stewart (Canada); Viking Press (US); Andre Deutsch (UK)
- Publication date: 1965
- Publication place: United States
- Pages: 250
- OCLC: 368948
- Preceded by: An Answer from Limbo (1962)
- Followed by: I Am Mary Dunne (1968)

The Emperor of Ice-Cream is a 1965 coming-of-age novel by writer Brian Moore. Set in Belfast during the Second World War, it tells the story of 17-year-old Gavin Burke who, admitting "war was freedom, freedom from futures", defies his nationalist and Catholic family by volunteering as an air raid warden with the largely Protestant ARP. The novel follows Gavin's journey as he realises that there are those on the other side of the city's bitter communal division whose friendships offer a wider horizon.

Based in part on Moore's own wartime experiences, he described it as the most autobiographical of his novels. Moore left Belfast in 1943 to join the British Ministry of War Transport and worked himself for a period with the ARP in London.

The book is dedicated, as were all of Moore's subsequent novels, to his partner Jean, who became his second wife two years after its publication. Its title is taken from Wallace Stevens' poem "The Emperor of Ice-Cream".

The book was dramatised by the Northern Irish actor, playwright and theatre director Bill Morrison; the play was performed at Dublin's Abbey Theatre in 1977.
