= The Love Kills Theory =

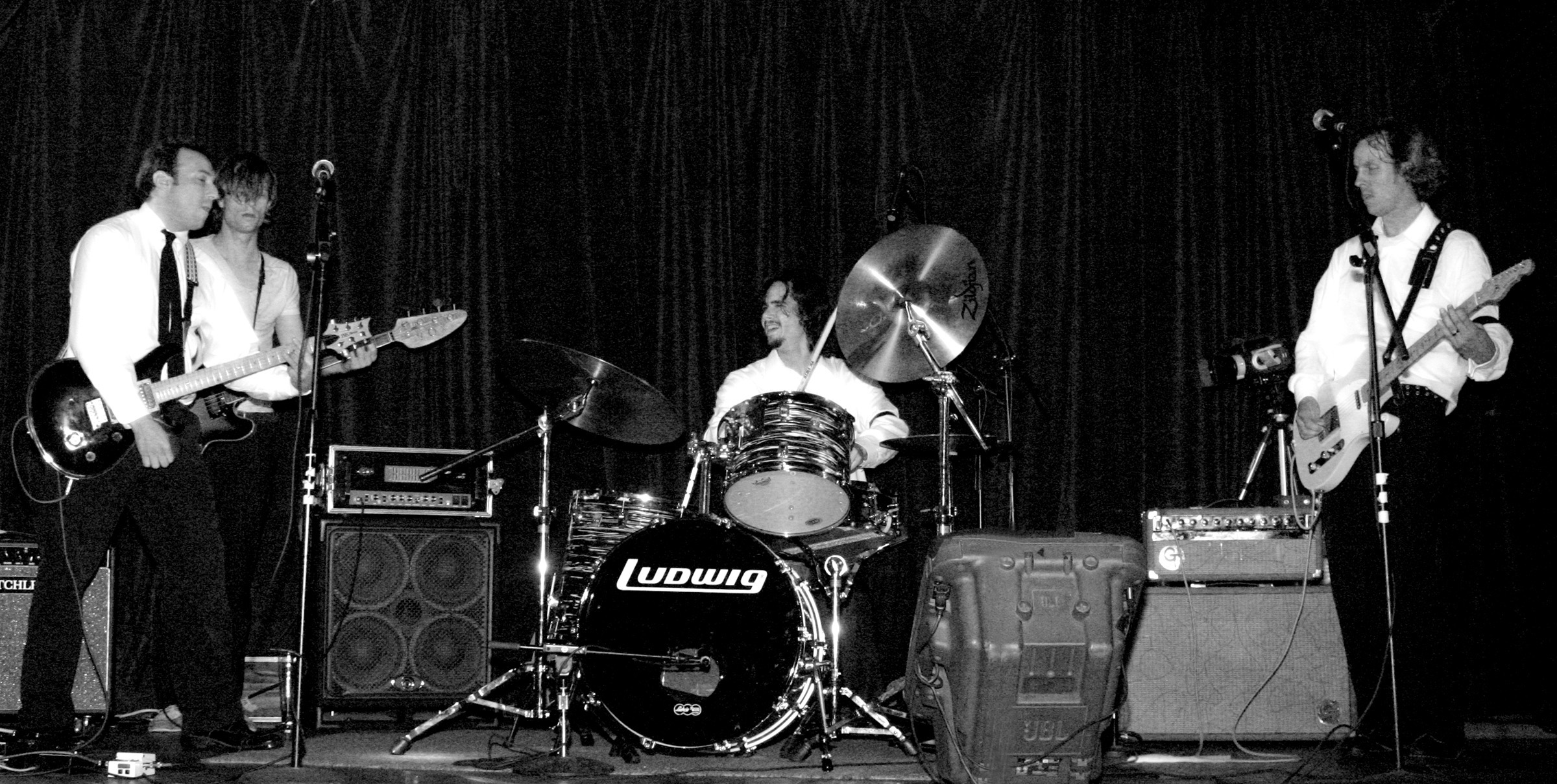
- The Love Kills Theory in 2009

Background information
- Origin: New York City
- Genres: alternative rock, indie, psychedelic rock, post-punk
- Labels: Xemu Records
- Members: Cevin Soling, Bill Brandau, Jim Minics, Darren Pilato, Jaron Stewart
- Website: http://www.thelovekillstheory.com/

The Love Kills Theory is an alternative rock band based in New York City. They were formed in 2006 by Cevin Soling, and in January 2007 they released their debut album Happy Suicide, Jim!, a thirteen track CD with philosophical and anti-consumerist themes. The band's original lineup consists of Bill Brandau on keyboard, Cevin Soling on vocals and guitar, Jim Minics on guitar, Darren Pilato on bass, and Jaron Stewart on drums.

== Founding ==
The band was originally formed by Cevin Soling. Soling had grown up listening to The Beatles.

After his last band The Neanderthal Spongecake broke up in 2001, Soling had accrued a number of songs he had written, and in 2006 he began contacting musicians he had played with or was friendly with to form a band. Bill Brandau, who had played with Soling in The Neanderthal Spongecake and had previously been in The Vinnie Barbarino Experience, took on keyboard duties. Darren Pilato was asked to play bass, and Jaron Stewart of the band Merkaba was included after also working on Soling's previous album release, When Pigs Fly. Jim Minics joined as guitarist; his 2003 band Minix had been a semi-finalist in the Independent Music World Series.

They are based in New York City.

The band name was largely inspired by author Neil Postman's summation of Brave New World, where instead of being subjugated and destroyed by things we hate, humanity is oppressed by the things they love.

== Happy Suicide, Jim! ==
On January 9, 2007 the band nationally released their debut CD Happy Suicide, Jim! It was published on Soling's Xemu Records, mixed by Martin Trum, engineered by Jim Sommers, and produced by Soling. All 13 songs were recorded at The Loft, Cheektowaga, and Penny Lane in New York City.

In January the album peaked at number 162 on CMJs Top 200. The album was also No. 1 on KZMU and had a long run in the top 5 albums in Montreal. The song "Authenticity" was played and featured on the Public Radio Exchange.

The album cover and name are a reference to cult leader Jim Jones.

== Style ==
The band members have specified they prefer "alternative rock" as a descriptor, though reviewers have also described them as post-punk and experimental. Reviewers have described a similarity to the intellectual rock bands in the early 1990s, such as Devo, Gang of Four, Butthole Surfers, Frank Zappa, and Mothers of Invention.

=== Lyrical themes ===
All lyrics are written by Soling, who claims to be influenced by writers such as Guy Debord, founder of the Situationist International, and Aldous Huxley, author of Brave New World and Yellow Chrome. They also focus on the "bio-genetic studies on the evolution of despair" and outline opposition to the instant gratification of consumer culture.

== Lineup ==
Present

- Cevin Soling – vocals, guitar
- Bill Brandau – keyboards
- Jim Minics – guitar
- Darren Pilato – bass
- Jaron Stewart – drums

Additional members

- Zy O. Lyn – violin
- Susan Dylan – violin
- Ben Kalb – cello
- Dan "Schmitty" Smith – guitar
- Dave Dudek – guitar
- Melinda Stewart – vocals
- Dana Goldstein – vocals
- Deborah Smith – vocals
