= Confessions of a Matchmaker =

American reality television series

Confessions of a Matchmaker is an American reality television series broadcast by the A&E Network.

The show, set in Buffalo, New York, premiered on June 16, 2007 and ran its first thirteen episodes throughout the summer of 2007. There was no second season.

This "pioneering" show is said to have started the genre that includes The Millionaire Matchmaker.

== Premise ==
The show which is set in Buffalo, New York, follows real life matchmaker Patti Novak as she tries to set up dates for her clients looking for love. A reviewer in The New York Times described Novak as, "plainspoken, but not rude, a classic dispenser of tough love." Each episode starts with Patti interviewing two new clients and questioning them on various topics, including why they have not been lucky in love in the past.

Next, Patti sets up her two new clients with two of her pre-existing clients. Each person goes on their date and the next day they are called by Patti and told to meet with her in her office. Sometimes, if the date goes well Patti tells her clients the good news that their date would like to see them again.

If the date goes poorly however, Patti is usually scolding her clients and telling them what they must do the next time to improve. If the first date does go poorly then the person is set up on a second date. If Patti's client does poorly on their date again and fails to improve, then they are usually dropped as a client.

== Critical reception ==
A reviewer for The Buffalo News pointed out that while the show often humiliated the matchmaker's single, often overweight, and not especially financially successful clients, they were aware of what they were letting themselves in for, and the episodes were often "laugh-out-loud funny." The reviewer for the Associated Press described the show's use of "real people who have real problems finding someone to love," and praised Novak's "spirit and refreshing honesty."

== Patti Novak ==
Novak was a professional matchmaker in Buffalo, New York.

Novak's career as a matchmaking guru continued after the show was terminated. Novak published a book, Get Over Yourself: How to Get Real, Get Serious, and Get Ready to Find True Love, co-authored with Laura Zigman.
