= Colin Turnbull =

British-American anthropologist (1924–1994)

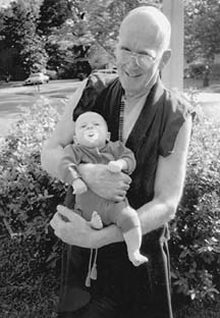
- Colin Turnbull holding a friend's baby, Gainesville, Florida, 1993
- Born: 23 November 1924; London, England
- Died: 28 July 1994 (aged 69); Virginia, U.S.
- Citizenship: British, later American
- Education: Magdalen College, Oxford; Banaras Hindu University
- Known for: The Forest People, The Mountain People
- Scientific career
- Fields: Anthropology; Ethnomusicology

Colin Macmillan Turnbull (23 November 1924 – 28 July 1994) was a British-American anthropologist who came to public attention with the popular books The Forest People (on the Mbuti Pygmies of Zaire) and The Mountain People (on the Ik people of Uganda), and one of the most significant influences on the postwar development of ethnomusicology.

== Early life ==
Turnbull was born in London and educated at Westminster School and Magdalen College, Oxford, where he studied politics and philosophy. During World War II he was in the Royal Naval Volunteer Reserve after which he was awarded a two-year grant in the Department of Indian Religion and Philosophy, Banaras Hindu University, India, from which he graduated with a master's degree in Indian Religion and Philosophy.

== Career ==
In 1951, after his graduation from Banaras, Turnbull traveled to the Belgian Congo (present-day Democratic Republic of the Congo) with Newton Beal, a schoolteacher from Ohio he met in India. Turnbull and Beal first studied the Mbuti pygmies during this time, though that was not the goal of the trip.

An "odd job" Turnbull picked up while in Africa at this time was working for the Hollywood producer Sam Spiegel. Spiegel hired Turnbull to assist in the construction and transportation of a boat needed for his film. This boat was the African Queen, which was used for the feature film The African Queen (starring Humphrey Bogart and Katharine Hepburn; 1951). After his first trip to Africa, Turnbull traveled to Yellowknife in the Northwest Territories, where he worked as a geologist and gold miner for a year, before he went back to school to obtain another degree.

Upon returning to Oxford in 1954, Turnbull began specializing in the anthropology of Africa. He remained in Oxford for two years before another field trip to Africa, finally focusing on the Belgian Congo (1957–58) and Uganda. After years of fieldwork, he finally achieved his anthropology doctorate from Oxford in 1964.

Turnbull became a naturalized citizen of the United States in 1965, after he moved to New York City to become curator in charge of African Ethnology at the American Museum of Natural History in 1959. He later resided in Lancaster County, and was on staff in the Department of Sociology and Anthropology, Virginia Commonwealth University, in Richmond, Virginia. Other professional associations included corresponding membership of Royal Museum for Central Africa and a fellowship in the British Royal Anthropological Institute. He first gained prominence with his book The Forest People (1961), a study of the Mbuti people.

In 1972, having been commissioned to come up with an explanation and solution to the difficulties experienced by the Ik people, he published his controversial ethnography The Mountain People. The Ik were a hunter-gatherer tribe who had been forced to stop moving around ancestral lands, through the seasons, because it now involved the three national borders of Uganda, Kenya and Sudan. Forced to become stationary in Uganda, and without a knowledge base and culture for survival under such conditions, they failed to thrive, even to the point of starvation and death. He described the Ik as driven to a radically selfish condition in which they felt no care or responsibility for anyone else, even their children.

Some later scholars criticized Turnbull's account of the Ik. Bernd Heine, who visited the tribe 20 years after Turnbull, provided new information in a 1985 article that appeared to discredit Turnbull's unflattering portrayal. According to a 2021 BBC radio documentary, Turnbull had drawn much of his image of the tribe from interviews with older Ik who contrasted their current situation with their memories of a better life prior to displacement, and therefore exaggerated the tribe's social dysfunction in the years Turnbull was present.

The Mountain People was later adapted into a theatrical work by playwright Peter Brook.

=== Contributions to music ===
Some of Turnbull's recordings of Mbuti music were commercially released, and his works inspired other ethnomusicological studies, such as those of Simha Arom and Mauro Campagnoli. His recording of Music of the Rainforest Pygmies, recorded in 1961, which has recently been released on CD by Lyrichord Discs, had a significantly wide public impact during the 1960s, influencing musicians as diverse as John Coltrane and Brian Eno. His recording of a Zaire pygmy girls' initiation song was used on the Voyager Golden Record.

== Personal life ==
Turnbull's partner was African American anthropologist Joseph Allen Towles; they met in 1959 and exchanged marriage vows the following year. In 1967 they moved to Lancaster County, Virginia, living "openly as a gay, interracial couple in one of the smallest and most conservative rural towns in Virginia".

From 1965 to 1967, Turnbull and Towles conducted fieldwork among the Ik of Northern Uganda in Africa. In the Congo in 1970, they conducted fieldwork on the Nkumbi circumcision initiation ritual for boys and the Asa myth of origin among the Mbo of the Ituri forest.

In 1979, they traveled studying the concept of tourism as pilgrimage. Towles criticised Turnbull's semi-autobiographical work The Human Cycle (1983), which omitted all references to their relationship.

== Later years ==
Late in life Turnbull took up the political cause of death row inmates. After his partner, Joseph Towles, died of AIDS in 1988, Turnbull donated all of his belongings to the United Negro College Fund. He donated all of their research materials, most of which were the product of his career, to the College of Charleston, insisting that the collection be known under Towles' name alone. Turnbull arranged for Towles' research to be published posthumously. It appeared in 1993 as Nkumbi initiation ritual and structure among the Mbo of Zaïre and as Asa: Myth of Origin of the Blood Brotherhood Among the Mbo of the Ituri Forest, both in Annales of the Royal Museum for Central Africa (Tervuren, Belgium), vol. 137.

In 1989, Turnbull moved to Bloomington, Indiana, to participate in the building of Tibetan Cultural Center with his friend Thupten Jigme Norbu, elder brother of the 14th Dalai Lama. Later Turnbull moved to Dharamsala, India where he took the monks' vow of Tibetan Buddhism, given to him by the Dalai Lama. Turnbull died of AIDS in 1994.

== Publications ==
- 1961 The Forest People. ISBN 0586059407
- 1962 The Lonely African. ISBN 0671200690
- 1962 The Peoples of Africa.
- 1965 Wayward Servants: The Two Worlds of the African Pygmies. ISBN 0837179270
- 1966 Tradition and Change in African Tribal Life.
- 1968 Tibet: Its History, Religion and People. (with Thubten Jigme Norbu). ISBN 0701113545
- 1972 The Mountain People. ISBN 0671640984
- 1973 Africa and Change editor. ISBN 0394315200
- 1976 Man in Africa. ISBN 0140220356
- 1978 "Rethinking the Ik: A functional Non-Social System". In: Charles D. Laughlin Jr.; Ivan A. Brady (ed.): Extinction and Survival in Human Populations. New York: Columbia University Press
- 1983 The Human Cycle. ISBN 0586084932
- 1983 The Mbuti Pygmies: Change and Adaptation. ISBN 0030615372
- 1992 Music of the Rain Forest Pygmies: The Historic Recordings Made By Colin M. Turnbull Label: Lyrichord Discs Inc.
- "The Mbuti Pygmies: An Ethnographic Survey" in Anthropological Papers of the American Museum of Natural History, 50: 139–282

== See also ==
- Simha Arom, who also studied pygmy culture

== Sources ==
- Grinker, Roy R. In the Arms of Africa: The Life of Colin M. Turnbull, Chicago: University of Chicago Press, 2001. ISBN 0226309045
- Smithsonian Institution: Review of In the Arms of Africa, AnthroNotes, Vol. 22, No. 1, Fall 2000.
