= Controversies surrounding the Society of Saint Pius X =

There have been several controversies surrounding the Society of St. Pius X, many of which concern political support for non-democratic regimes, alleged antisemitism, and the occupation of church buildings. The Society of St. Pius X is an international organisation founded in 1970 by the French traditionalist Catholic archbishop Marcel Lefebvre.

== Political controversies ==
=== France ===
There is an overlap in French society between the SSPX's constituency of support and support for reactionary political positions. In the French context, such positions include:

- Condemnation of the 1789 French Revolution and of the French Republic, accompanied by support for the restoration of the absolutist French monarchy. Archbishop Lefebvre vocally condemned the French Revolution, the ensuing dechristianization of France, and Reign of Terror by the Jacobin Club. The Archbishop called the Revolution's principles "Masonic and Anti-Catholic". He expressed regret that the extreme classical liberalism personified by the Revolution had entered "mitered heads", before, during, and after Vatican II. Lefebvre's close associate and right hand Fr. Paul Aulagnier, who has since left the SSPX and been reconciled with the Church hierarchy, was quoted in an SSPX periodical in 2001 as saying, while serving in Belgium (a constitutional monarchy): "I am pleased to be in Brussels – I who detest the republic and hate democracy."
- Support for the Vichy government (1940–1944). Lefebvre spoke approvingly of the "Catholic order of Pétain", referring to the Vichy Premier Marshal Philippe Pétain, who was later convicted of treason and collaboration with Nazi Germany. The Society organises pilgrimages to Pétain's tomb, and during the 1987 pilgrimage the Archbishop referred to him as having "restored [France] spiritually and morally". Furthermore, Archbishop Lefebvre offered public prayers of devotion and intercession to Pétain at I'lle d'Yeu in 1987, pronouncing his belief that Marshal Pétain was in heaven. The antisemitic French historian Bernard Faÿ, who was appointed director of the anti-Masonic services and propagandist for the Vichy government, is credited with inspiring the Archbishop to found what became the SSPX in 1970. The Society's official journal in Belgium has denounced the anti-Vichy trials conducted after World War II by the mainstream republican followers of Charles De Gaulle. The trials resulted in 791 executions and almost 50,000 forfeitures of civil rights. There have also been allegations that the SSPX had links with Vichy functionary Paul Touvier and that Vichy songs were learned at a scout camp of the Society (see below).
- Support for the Front National political party and its former leader, Jean-Marie le Pen, who is on the far right of the French political spectrum. In 1985, Lefebvre was quoted in the French far-right periodical Présent as endorsing Jean-Marie Le Pen, though his endorsement was made on the basis that Le Pen was the only major French politician who unambiguously condemned abortion. In 1991, the then SSPX priest Fr. Philippe Laguérie called the Front National "the party least removed from the natural law".
- Civitas, the far-right political association in France founded in 1999, has historical, formal, and informal ties to the SSPX. It maintained the status of political party in France from 2016-2023 before it was suppressed as a party by the French government for antisemitism. Civitas maintains integralist, Maurrassian principles of thought stemming from the pro-Vichy intellectual and activist Jean Ousset, an influence on Lefebvre's thought and who also supported Archbishop Lefebvre's movement until they parted ways over differing views of Catholic Action. Nonetheless, the SSPX in France has maintained ties with Ousset's work and inheritance, including Civitas. The group is currently led by Belgian far-right activist Alain Escada, who has been influenced by the SSPX and its teachings. Abbe Xavier Beauvais, former pastor of Saint-Nicolas-du-Chardonnet and priest of the SSPX, speaks at Civitas events. Civitas left the official oversight of the SSPX in 2017 for the Capuchin Friars of Morgon, who have collaborated with them in political action along far-right lines. As of 2023, the Capuchins of Morgon are led by former SSPX district superior of France, Regis de Cacqueray. During the COVID-19 pandemic, Civitas spread conspiracy and opposed pandemic mitigating measures.

Archbishop Lefebvre's first biographer, the English traditionalist writer Michael Davies, wrote in the first volume of his Apologia Pro Marcel Lefebvre:

In France political feeling tends to be more polarized, more extreme, and far more deeply felt than in England. ...Since the [Second World] war, and especially since Vatican II, the official French Church has veered sharply to the left. ...Thus, a large proportion of right-wing Catholics was predisposed to support any religious movement opposed to the policies of the French hierarchy. The political views of some of the French Catholics who support the Archbishop would certainly be odious to many English-speaking traditionalists – although such views are more understandable (if not acceptable) within the French context. However, if they wish to support the Archbishop (and not necessarily for the right reasons) there is nothing he can do about it. ...The French hierarchy has replaced [Catholic] social teaching with diluted Marxism to such an extent that anyone adopting the Catholic position is now automatically accused of fascism.

== Occupation of the Church of Saint Nicolas du Chardonnet in Paris ==
In 1977, a group of SSPX priests and laypeople led by Monsignor François Ducaud-Bourget entered the parish Church of Saint Nicolas du Chardonnet in central Paris and celebrated Mass. They subsequently refused to leave, and the church remains in the possession of the SSPX to this day.

Various French municipal authorities have had ownership of the older churches in France since the enactment of the 1905 French law on the Separation of the Churches and the State, though the buildings are permitted to be used by the appropriate religious denominations. Ducaud-Bourget maintained that Traditionalist Catholics represented by the SSPX were the true heirs of the Catholics of 1905. Although the occupation was declared illegal by French courts, the authorities reached the conclusion that, in contrast to forcibly evicting the SSPX, the continuing occupation would cause less disturbance to public order. A 1993 SSPX attempt to occupy another Paris church, Saint-Germain-l'Auxerrois, was unsuccessful.

== Antisemitism and Holocaust denial ==
=== Bishop Richard Williamson ===
The views of Bishop Williamson were a particular source of controversy. For example, the bishop wrote:

However, until they re-discover their true Messianic vocation, they may be expected to continue fanatically agitating, in accordance with their false messianic vocation of Jewish world-dominion, to prepare the Anti-Christ's throne in Jerusalem. So we may fear their continuing to play their major part in the agitation of the East and in the corruption of the West. Here the wise Catholic will remember that, again, the ex-Christian nations have only their own Liberalism to blame for allowing free circulation within Christendom to the enemies of Christ.

In an interview with Swedish Television in November 2008, whose broadcast on 21 January 2009, the day the Holy See lifted the excommunication of the four SSPX bishops, gained wide publicity, Williamson repeated his opinion that the generally accepted history of the Holocaust is wrong. He accepted an estimate of only 200,000–300,000 Jews had perished in Nazi concentration camps, and denied that any were killed in gas chambers. Subsequently, former SSPX seminarians have come forward with additional information about Williamson's Jewish views. One former seminarian characterized Williamson as "a sick man" with "a horrible attitude toward women and a horrible attitude toward Jews." The Vatican repudiated Williamson's views as "intolerable and altogether unacceptable."

Williamson's views on this and other subjects remain controversial, even within Traditionalist Catholicism. After his interview, broadcast by Swedish Television on 21 January 2009, both the Superior General of the SSPX, Bishop Fellay, and the District Superior of the SSPX in Germany, Fr. Franz Schmidberger, stated that Williamson's views represented his own personal opinions; and Bishop Fellay, as superior general of the Society, "prohibited him, pending any new orders, from taking any public positions on political or historical questions."

Although the SSPX authorities have thus distinguished Williamson's views from those of the Society, the Anti-Defamation League has accused the SSPX of being "mired in anti-Semitism", and journalist John L. Allen Jr., has said it would be misleading to consider Williamson an isolated case: Father Florian Abrahamowicz, who after being the superior in Italy has since been expelled from the Society also said he was not sure the Nazis had used gas chambers for anything other than disinfection, seemed to cast doubt on the number of six million Jews killed, complained that the Jews had exalted the Holocaust above other genocides, and called the Jews first "the people of God" and then the "people of deicide", to be converted to Jesus Christ at the end times.

Williamson was forced out of the SSPX on 23 October 2012 for the "common good of the society", following his refusal to submit to the group's leadership.

=== Bishop Bernard Fellay ===
During a radio interview on 28 December 2013, the then-Superior General Bishop Bernard Fellay said "Who, during that time, was the most opposed that the Church would recognize the Society? The enemies of the Church. The Jews, the Masons, the Modernists." His statement angered a lot of people, particularly Jewish people, and took it as an attack to them. Various media outlets also covered the statement. The Vatican also denounced Fellay and his religious movement, reaffirming their ecumenical dialogue with the Jews. The Vatican chief spokesman, Father Federico Lombardi SJ, said that it was "meaningless" and "unacceptable" to label Jews as "enemies" of the Catholic Church.

=== Paul Touvier ===
On 24 May 1989, Paul Touvier, a former secret police official for the Petain's Government, was arrested in a Society priory in Nice. The SSPX stated at the time that Touvier had no link to the Society, and had been allowed to stay at the Priory as "an act of charity to a homeless man". In 1994, Touvier was sentenced to life imprisonment for the 1944 summary execution of seven Jews at Rillieux-la-Pape. The massacre was a reprisal for the French Resistance's killing of Petain's propaganda minister Philippe Henriot. On his death in 1996, a Requiem Mass for the repose of Touvier's soul was offered by Father Philippe Laguérie, an SSPX priest who was then Rector of the Parisian Church of Saint-Nicolas-du-Chardonnet. Like Fr. Aulagnier, however, Fr. Laguerie subsequently left the Society and founded the Institute of the Good Shepherd with papal approval.

=== Leon Degrelle ===
Abbe Beauvais, who served as the SSPX priest and pastor of Saint-Nicolas-du-Chardonnet from 2003 to 2014, publicly praises Catholic Rexist Party founder and Waffen-SS officer Leon Degrelle. Degrelle had a lengthy postwar career in Spain under Francisco Franco, where he was allowed to promote Nazi ideology, Catholic integrism, and Holocaust denial. Abbe Beauvais also quotes approvingly from Degrelle's book Burning Souls as an inspirational source in an editorial found in the SSPX publication, Le Chardonnet.

=== Southern Poverty Law Center report ===
The SSPX was also accused of antisemitism in a 2006 report on Traditionalist Catholicism published by the legal advocacy organization Southern Poverty Law Center.

=== Newsletters and websites ===
The Society was reported to have perpetuated the Jewish deicide and Jewish world domination plot canards in its official newsletters and on several of its international websites (although the offending websites have been removed since the controversy surrounding the bishops' reinstatement).

The website of the SSPX in the United States carried a 1997 article from The Angelus titled "The Mystery of the Jewish People in History" which the Overland Express of Melbourne said "methodically repeats every slur of medieval anti-Semitism." The piece was written by British priests Michael Crowdy and Kenneth Novak.

=== The Angelus Press ===
SSPX's The Angelus is known to sell antisemitic publications in their bookstores such as "Liberalism Is a Sin" by Fr. Félix Sardà y Salvany, "The Jews" by Hilaire Belloc, "Freemasonry unmasked" by Monsignor George Dillon, "The Mystery of Freemasonry Unveiled", "The Protocols of the Elders of Zion", and "The Kingship of Christ and Organized Naturalism" by the Rev. Denis Fahey C.S.Sp. The Angelus Press also sells a book published by the Society entitled Christian Warfare, which recommends under the heading of "Good Reading Material" the works of Fr. Denis Fahey and Leon de Poncins, known antisemitic writers who spread Jewish Bolshevik conspiracy theories in the 20th century.

== Statements by SSPX clerics about Church authorities ==
One of the Society's four bishops, Bernard Tissier de Mallerais, has stated that Pope Benedict XVI "has professed heresies in the past! He [...] has never retracted his errors. When he was a theologian, he professed heresies, he published a book full of heresies." In the same interview, Bishop Mallerais said of the Second Vatican Council: "You cannot read Vatican II as a Catholic work. It is based on the philosophy of Immanuel Kant. [...] I will say, one day the Church should erase this Council. She will not speak of it anymore. She must forget it. The Church will be wise if she forgets this Council."

Similarly, Bishop Richard Williamson has said of Pope Benedict XVI: "His past writings are full of Modernist errors. Now, Modernism is the synthesis of all heresies (Pascendi, Pope St. Pius X). So Ratzinger as a heretic goes far beyond Luther's Protestant errors, as Bishop Tissier de Mallerais said." Williamson added that the documents of the Second Vatican Council "are much too subtly and deeply poisoned to be reinterpreted. The whole of a partly poisoned cake goes to the trash can!"

== SSPX and Scouting ==
A number of groups whose following overlaps with that of the SSPX, such as the Scouts d'Europe, have been accused of extremist leanings. In 1998, the Association Française de Scouts et Guides Catholiques faced international scrutiny following an accident at Perros-Guirec that claimed the lives of four marine Scouts and a sailor who died in an attempt to save them. A media frenzy followed, and it was alleged that Fr. Cottard, the SSPX priest responsible for the children, had subjected them to a harsh disciplinary regimen, forcing them to spend the night before their deaths sleeping on a pebbled beach. Cottard had also failed to call emergency services for almost 8 hours, and did not take basic safety precautions such as properly checking the weather forecast.

== Erich Priebke ==
When former SS Captain Erich Priebke died in October 2013, the Diocese of Rome forbade a Requiem Mass for him. The reasons cited were Priebke's involvement in murdering 335 Italians in the 1944 Ardeatine Massacre, and his subsequent lack of remorse. SSPX offered to hold a funeral and issued a statement on their website saying, "A Christian who was baptized and received the sacraments of confession and the Eucharist, no matter what his faults and sins were, to the extent that he dies reconciled with God and the church, has a right to the celebration of the holy Mass and a funeral." Nevertheless, the ceremony was not held due to 500 protesters outside SSPX headquarters in Albano. The lawyer, Paolo Giachini, told reporters outside the building that the funeral Mass had not taken place, but that he had fulfilled his obligation to arrange a funeral. "Now it's up to the authorities to decide what to do with the body," since he was unable to find a city where Priebke could be buried.

== Allegations of abuse cover-up ==
On 5 April 2017 Uppdrag Granskning, a Swedish investigative journalism television program, reported that four different clerics of the SSPX – three priests and a former seminarian – had molested at least a dozen young people in several different countries. The program also stated that evidence of abuse was kept secret by the SSPX, and priests were allowed to continue in ministry.

In May 2020, the Kansas Bureau of Investigation (KBI) started an investigation against SSPX groups affiliated with, though not overseen by, the state's four Roman Catholic dioceses. SSPX members in Kansas were accused of either perpetrating or covering up clerical sex abuse in the state. For many years, the SSPX Saint Mary's Rectory in Kansas faced numerous sex abuse allegations. In January 2023, The KBI's four-year inquiry into alleged child sexual abuse in four Catholic dioceses and the SSPX within the state of Kansas resulted in referral of 30 cases to county prosecutors targeting 14 members of the clergy.

An executive summary of the KBI report said no prosecutor had charged any priests named in KBI affidavits with sexual crimes, citing 2013 Kansas legislation which eliminated the statute of limitations on certain sex crimes, but which did not make the elimination retroactive.

== Other controversies ==
In February 2008, Saint Mary's College, a school in Kansas affiliated with the SSPX, refused to allow a woman referee to officiate at a high-school basketball game in which their school was participating, reportedly on the grounds it was inappropriate for a woman to be in a position of authority over male students. In response, the other referees refused to referee the game. The school issued a statement denying that the refusal was due to the reported reason. It stated instead that "[the] formation of adolescent boys is best accomplished by male role models," and that "teaching our boys to treat ladies with deference, we cannot place them in an aggressive athletic competition where they are forced to play inhibited by their concern about running into a female referee."

In May 2012, Our Lady of Sorrows Academy in Phoenix, Arizona, also affiliated with the SSPX, forfeited the Arizona Charter Athletic Association state baseball championship game rather than play against a team with a female player. The opposing team, from Mesa Preparatory Academy in Mesa, Arizona, included Paige Sultzbach, playing infield. Officials at Our Lady of Sorrows issued a statement saying that the decision to forfeit was consistent with a policy against co-ed sports. They stated that school teaches boys respect by not placing girls in athletic competition, where "proper boundaries can only be respected with difficulty."

In July 2026, consecrations of four bishops by the Society of Saint Pius X at Écône, Switzerland, resulted in automatic excommunication. More than 1,000 priests, religious men and women, and about 15,000 people had attended the ceremony. Fr. Davide Pagliarani, superior general of the SSPX, said in his homily at the consecration Mass that the pope's appeal presented a "false dilemma" between the society's vision of the faith and its adherence to the church. Cardinal Víctor Manuel Fernández, Prefect of the Dicastery for the Doctrine of the Faith, defined the rite celebrated on 1 July as an "act of a schismatic nature;" and a new separation of the bishops and priests of the Fraternity of Saint Pius X from the Church of Rome. "As for the lay faithful, those who formally adhere to the Fraternity are to be considered excommunicated."

== See also ==
- Independent Catholicism
