= Glaeser's theorem =

Glaeser's theorem may refer to:

- Glaeser's composition theorem
- Glaeser's continuity theorem
