= Ronald Harwood =

South African playwright and novelist (1934–2020)

Sir Ronald Harwood CBE FRSL
- Born: Ronald Horwitz; 9 November 1934; Cape Town, Union of South Africa
- Died: 8 September 2020 (aged 85); Sussex, England
- Education: Sea Point High School
- Alma mater: Royal Academy of Dramatic Art
- Occupation: Writer
- Years active: 1960–2015
- Spouse: Natasha Riehle (m. 1959; died 2013)
- Children: 3
- Relatives: Sir Antony Sher (cousin)

President of PEN International
- In office October 1993 – October 1997
- Preceded by: György Konrád
- Succeeded by: Homero Aridjis

Sir Ronald Harwood CBE FRSL (né Horwitz; 9 November 1934 – 8 September 2020) was a South African-born British author, playwright, and screenwriter, best known for his plays for the British stage as well as the screenplays for The Dresser (for which he was nominated for an Oscar) and The Pianist, for which he won the 2003 Academy Award for Best Adapted Screenplay. He was nominated for the Best Adapted Screenplay Oscar for The Diving Bell and the Butterfly (2007).

== Early life and career ==
Harwood was born Ronald Horwitz in Cape Town, in what was then the Union of South Africa, the son of Isobel (née Pepper) and Isaac Horwitz. After attending Sea Point High School, Harwood moved from Cape Town to London in 1951 to pursue a career in the theatre. He changed his surname from Horwitz to Harwood after an English master told him it was too foreign and too Jewish for a stage actor.

After training for the stage at the Royal Academy of Dramatic Art, he joined the Shakespeare Company of Sir Donald Wolfit. From 1953 to 1958, Harwood was Sir Donald's personal dresser. He later drew on this experience when he wrote the stage play The Dresser and the biography Sir Donald Wolfit CBE: His Life and Work in the Unfashionable Theatre. In 1959, after leaving the Donald Wolfit Company, Harwood joined the 59 Theatre Company for a season at the Lyric Hammersmith, during which he played the role of Pablo both in the stage debut of Alun Owen's play The Rough and Ready Lot and in its 1959 television adaptation.

In 1960 Harwood began a career as a writer. He published his first novel, All the Same Shadows, in 1961, the screenplay for Private Potter (1962) from his television drama, and the stage play March Hares in 1964. Harwood continued at a prolific pace, writing more than 21 stage plays and 10 books. He also created more than 16 screen plays, but seldom wrote original material directly for the screen, usually acting as an adapter, sometimes of his own work, as with The Dresser.

One of the recurring themes in Harwood's work is his fascination with the stage, its performing artists and artisans, as displayed in The Dresser, After the Lions (about Sarah Bernhardt), Another Time (a semi-autobiographical piece about a gifted South African pianist), Quartet (about ageing opera singers), and his non-fiction book All the World's a Stage, a general history of theatre.

Harwood also had a strong interest in the Nazi period, especially the situation of individuals who either voluntarily collaborated with the Nazis or, alternatively, faced strong pressure to do so and had, in each case, to work out their own personal combination of resistance, deception and compromise. His work focusing on this period includes the films Operation Daybreak (covering the assassination by the Czechoslovak resistance of the Nazi leader Reinhard Heydrich), The Statement (a fictionalized account of the post-War life on the run of the French collaborator Paul Touvier), The Pianist (an adaptation of the autobiography of the Jewish-Polish musician Władysław Szpilman covering his survival during the Nazi occupation of Poland), the play later adapted to film Taking Sides (focused on the post-War "de-Nazification" investigation of the German conductor Wilhelm Furtwängler), the play Collaboration (about the composer Richard Strauss and his partnership with the Jewish writer Stefan Zweig), and the play An English Tragedy (dealing with the British fascist John Amery).

Harwood also wrote the screenplay for the films The Browning Version (1994) with Albert Finney, Being Julia (2004) with Annette Bening and Jeremy Irons, and Roman Polanski's version of Oliver Twist (2005) with Ben Kingsley.

He won an Academy Award for the script of The Pianist, having already been nominated for The Dresser in 1983. Harwood received his third Oscar nomination for Best Adapted Screenplay in 2007 for his adaptation of the memoir by Jean-Dominique Bauby, The Diving Bell and the Butterfly, for which he also won a BAFTA and the Prix Jacques Prévert du Scénario in 2008, for Best Adaptation. In 2008 Harwood was also given the Humanitas Award in recognition of The Diving Bell and the Butterfly.

== Recognition ==
Harwood was President of the English PEN Club from 1989 to 1993, and of PEN International from 1993 to 1997. He was Chairman of the Royal Society of Literature from 2001 to 2004, and was president of the Royal Literary Fund from 2005. He was made a Fellow of the Royal Society of Literature (FRSL) in 1974, Knight (Chevalier) of the Ordre des Arts et des Lettres in 1996, and Commander of the Order of the British Empire (CBE) in 1999.

In 2003 he was appointed a member at the Department of Language and Literature of the Serbian Academy of Sciences and Arts. He was awarded a DLitt degree from Keele University in 2002, honoured with a Doctor Honoris Causa from the Krastyo Sarafov National Academy for Theatre and Film Arts (Sofia, Bulgaria) in 2007, made an Honorary Fellow of the Central School of Speech and Drama (London, England) in 2007, and an Honorary Fellow of the University of Chichester in 2009. Harwood was knighted in the 2010 Birthday Honours.

National Life Stories conducted an oral history interview (C1173/02) with Harwood in 2005–2007 for its An Oral History of Theatre Design collection held by the British Library. In 2004 the British Library also acquired the papers of Ronald Harwood, consisting of manuscripts and papers, correspondence, and press cuttings.

He was named Chairman of the Yvonne Arnaud Theatre in Guildford in 2008. He was made an Honorary Fellow of the University of Chichester in 2009. In June 2013 he was awarded an honorary degree from the University of Aberdeen by the Duchess of Rothesay. He received the National Jewish Theatre Foundation Lifetime Achievement Award in 2014.

In May 2017 an authorized biography of Harwood, Speak Well of Me by W. Sydney Robinson, was published by Oberon Books.

== Personal life ==
He attended the Seapoint Boys' High School in that area of Cape Town. He moved to England in 1951. In 1959 he married Natasha Riehle (1938–2013), a descendant of Russian nobility. They had three children: Antony (born 1960), Deborah (born 1963), and the composer Alexandra Harwood (born 1966).

The actor Sir Antony Sher was his first cousin once removed. Harwood was the brother of the South African dance critic Eve Borland.

Harwood died from natural causes at his home in Sussex on 8 September 2020, at age 85.

== Bibliography ==
=== Stage plays ===
- March Hares (Liverpool, 1964)
- Country Matters (69 Theatre Company, Manchester, 1969)
- The Good Companions (musical by André Previn and Johnny Mercer), libretto (Her Majesty's Theatre, 1974)
- The Ordeal of Gilbert Pinfold, adapted from Evelyn Waugh's novel (Royal Exchange Theatre, Manchester and the Round House, London, 1977,
- A Family (Royal Exchange Theatre, Manchester and the Theatre Royal, Haymarket, 1978)
- The Dresser (The Royal Exchange, Manchester and Queen's Theatre, 1980; Duke of York's Theatre, 2005)
- After the Lions (The Royal Exchange, Manchester, 1982)
- Tramway Road (Lyric Hammersmith, 1984)
- The Deliberate Death of a Polish Priest (Almeida Theatre, 1985)
- Interpreters (Queen's Theatre, 1985)
- J J Farr (Theatre Royal, Bath and Phoenix Theatre, 1987)
- Ivanov, translation of Chekhov's play (Strand Theatre, 1989)
- Another Time (Bath and Wyndham's Theatre, 1989)
- Reflected Glory (Darlington and Vaudeville Theatre, 1992)
- Poison Pen, about the death of composer Peter Warlock (the Royal Exchange, Manchester, 1993))
- Taking Sides, about the conductor Wilhelm Furtwängler (Minerva Theatre, Chichester, 1995 and 2008; Duchess Theatre, 2009)
- The Handyman (Minerva Theatre, Chichester, 1996)
- Quartet (Albery Theatre, 1999)
- Goodbye Kiss/Guests, double bill about the South African diaspora (Orange Tree Theatre, 2000)
- Mahler's Conversion (Yvonne Arnaud Theatre, Guildford and Aldwych Theatre, 2001)
- See U Next Tuesday, adaptation of Francis Veber's Diner de Cons (Gate Theatre, Dublin, 2002 and Albery Theatre, 2003)
- An English Tragedy, based on the true story of the British fascist John Amery (Palace Theatre Watford, 2008)
- Collaboration, based on the relationship between the composer Richard Strauss and the writer Stefan Zweig (Minerva Theatre, Chichester, 2008; Duchess Theatre, 2009)
- Taking Tea With Stalin: Harwood presented the fascination of European intellectuals with the Soviet Union. George Bernard Shaw with Nancy Astor and Waldorf Astor visited Stalin in Moscow. The drama was filmed by Polish Television in 2001 under the title Herbatka u Stalina.

=== Screenplays ===
- Private Potter (1962)
- The Barber of Stamford Hill (1962)
- A High Wind in Jamaica (1965, based on the novel A High Wind in Jamaica by Richard Hughes)
- Drop Dead Darling (1966, suggested by The Careful Man by Richard Deming)
- Diamonds for Breakfast (1968)
- Eyewitness (1970, based on the novel The Eyewitness by Mark Hebden)
- One Day in the Life of Ivan Denisovich (1970, based on the novel One Day in the Life of Ivan Denisovich by Aleksandr Solzhenitsyn)
- Operation Daybreak (1975, based on the non-fiction-book Seven Men at Daybreak by Alan Burgess)
- Tales of the Unexpected (1979-1981, anthology television series, wrote 12 episodes)
- Evita Peron (1981, television film, based on the non-fiction-books Evita, First Lady by John Barnes, and Evita: The Real Life of Eva Peron by Nicholas Fraser)
- The Dresser (1983) (also producer)
- The Doctor and the Devils (1985, based on an earlier screenplay by Dylan Thomas)
- Mandela (1987, TV film)
- Countdown to War (1989, TV film)
- A Fine Romance (1991, based on the play Tchin-Tchin by François Billetdoux)
- The Browning Version (1994, based on the play The Browning Version by Terence Rattigan)
- Cry, the Beloved Country (1995, based on the novel Cry, the Beloved Country by Alan Paton)
- Taking Sides (2001)
- The Pianist (2002, based on the memoir The Pianist by Władysław Szpilman)
- The Statement (2003, based on the novel The Statement by Brian Moore)
- Being Julia (2004, based on the novel Theatre by W. Somerset Maugham)
- Oliver Twist (2005, based on the novel Oliver Twist by Charles Dickens)
- The Diving Bell and the Butterfly (2007, based on the memoir The Diving Bell and the Butterfly by Jean-Dominique Bauby)
- Love in the Time of Cholera (2007, based on the novel Love in the Time of Cholera by Gabriel García Márquez)
- Australia (2008)
- Quartet (2012)

=== Books and published works ===
- All the Same Shadows (novel) Cape (1961)
- George Washington September Sir! (novel) Avon (1961)
- The Guilt Merchants (novel) Cape (1963) ISBN 978-0-030-81338-2
- The Girl in Melanie Klein (novel) Secker & Warburg (1969) ISBN 978-0-030-76440-0
- Sir Donald Wolfit: His Life and Work in the Unfashionable Theatre (biography) Secker & Warburg (1971) ISBN 0-436-19121-0
- Articles of Faith (novel – winner of the Winifred Holtby Memorial Prize) Secker & Warburg (1973) ISBN 0-436-19122-9
- The Genoa Ferry (novel) Secker & Warburg (1976) ISBN 0-436-19123-7
- César and Augusta (novel about the composers César Franck and Augusta Holmes) Secker & Warburg (1978) ISBN 0-436-19119-9
- One. Interior. Day. Adventures in the Film Trade, Secker & Warburg (1978) ISBN 0-436-19124-5
- New Stories 3: An Arts Council Anthology (with Francis King) Hutchinson (1978) ISBN 0-09-133271-0
- The Dresser (play) Grove Press (1981) ISBN 0-394-17936-6
- A Night at the Theatre (editor), Methuen (1982) ISBN 0-413-49950-2
- The Ordeal of Gilbert Pinfold (play) Amber Lane (1983) ISBN 0-906399-42-4
- After the Lions (play) Amber Lane (1983) ISBN 0-906399-41-6
- All the World's a Stage (theatre history), Secker & Warburg (1984) ISBN 0-436-19132-6
- The Ages of Gielgud, an Actor at Eighty, Hodder & Stoughton (1984) ISBN 0-340-34828-3
- Tramway Road (play) Amber Lane (1984) ISBN 0-906399-58-0
- The Deliberate Death of a Polish Priest (play) Amber Lane (1985) ISBN 0-906399-63-7
- Interpreters (play) Amber Lane (1986) ISBN 0-906399-67-X
- Mandela (a Channel Four book), Boxtree (1987) ISBN 1-85283-204-5
- Dear Alec: Guinness at 75 (editor), Hodder & Stoughton (1989) ISBN 0-340-49954-0
- Another Time (play) Amber Lane (1989) ISBN 0-906399-98-X
- Reflected Glory (play) Faber (1992) ISBN 0-571-16463-3
- Home (novel) Weidenfeld & Nicolson (1993) ISBN 0-297-81368-4
- The Collected Plays of Ronald Harwood, Faber (1993) ISBN 0-571-17001-3
- The Faber Book of the Theatre (editor) Faber (1994) ISBN 0-571-16481-1
- Harwood Plays: Two (Contemporary Classics), Faber (1995) ISBN 90-01-87742-7
- The Handyman (play) Faber (1997) ISBN 0-571-19041-3
- Quartet/Equally Divided (plays) Faber (1999) ISBN 0-571-20092-3)
- Mahler's Conversion (play) Faber (2001) ISBN 978-0-571-21231-6
- The Pianist/Taking Sides (screenplays) Faber (2003) ISBN 0-571-21281-6
- An English Tragedy (play) Faber (2006) ISBN 0-571-23328-7
- Ronald Harwood's Adaptations: From Other Works Into Films, Guerilla Books (2007) ISBN 978-0-9554943-0-7

== See also ==
- List of Jews from Sub-Saharan Africa
- List of British Jews
- List of South Africans

Non-profit organization positions
Preceded by György Konrád	International President of PEN International; 1993–1997	Succeeded by Homero Aridjis
