= The Magician's Wife =

The Magician's Wife may refer to:

- The Magician's Wife (Moore novel), a 1997 novel by Brian Moore
- The Magician's Wife (Cain novel), a 1965 novel by James M. Cain
