= Georges Glaeser =

French mathematician (1918–2002)

Georges Glaeser (8 November 1918 – 1 September 2002) was a French mathematician who was director of the IREM of Strasbourg. He worked in analysis and mathematical education and introduced Glaeser's composition theorem and Glaeser's continuity theorem. Glaeser was a Ph.D. student of Laurent Schwartz.

On 3 July 1973, Glaeser filed a complaint against Vichy collaborator Paul Touvier in the Lyon Court, charging him with crimes against humanity. Glaeser accused Touvier of the 1944 massacre at Rillieux-la-Pape, in which Glaeser's father was murdered. Touvier was eventually imprisoned for life on this charge in 1994.

== Affiliations ==
- IAS School of Mathematics (9/1961 – 5/1962)

== Education ==
- University of Nancy (Class of 1957)

== Selected publications ==
- Glaeser, Georges (1963), "Fonctions composées différentiables", Annals of Mathematics, Second Series, 77 (1): 193–209, doi:10.2307/1970204, JSTOR 1970204, MR 0143058
- "Etude de quelques algebres tayloriennes"
- "Racine carrée d'une fonction différentiable", Annales de l'Institut Fourier 13, no. 2 (1963), 203–210
- "Une introduction à la didactique expérimentale des mathématiques"

== Sources ==
- Pluvinage, François (2002), "In Memoriam — Georges Glaeser (1918–2002)" (PDF), The International Commission on Mathematical Instruction, Bulletin, 51: 63–66
- Georges Glaeser at the Mathematics Genealogy Project
- Bibliography
- LOPES, M. (2000). "Didática da Matemática e a atuação pioneira de Georges Glaeser". Boletim GEPEM, Rio de Janeiro, (37), pp. 45-50. (in Portuguese)
