= The Statement (novel) =

1995 novel by Brian Moore

- First UK edition (publ. Bloomsbury)
- Author: Brian Moore
- Genre: Thriller novel
- Publisher: Bloomsbury (UK); E.P. Dutton (U.S.)
- Publication date: 1995 (UK); 1996 (U.S.)
- Preceded by: Lies of Silence (1990)
- Followed by: The Magician's Wife (1997)

The Statement (1995) is a thriller novel by Northern Irish-Canadian writer Brian Moore. Set in the south of France and Paris in the early 1990s, The Statement is the tale of Pierre Brossard, a former officer in the pro-fascist militia that served Vichy France and a murderer of Jews. The novel was published by Bloomsbury in the United Kingdom in 1995 and by E.P. Dutton in the United States on 1 June 1996.

== Plot summary ==
At 70 years old, Brossard spent the better part of his life in hiding by traveling among the monasteries and abbeys that offered him asylum. Though he evaded capture for decades with the help of the French government and Catholic Church, a new breed of government officials is determined to break decades of silence and expose the crimes of Vichy France.

== Inspiration ==
The character of Pierre Brossard in The Statement is inspired by Paul Touvier (1915–1996), a French Nazi collaborator who was arrested for war crimes in 1989. After his arrest, charges appeared in the media that alleged that Touvier had been protected by the Catholic Church and government officials. In 1994, Touvier became the first Frenchman ever convicted of crimes against humanity, for his participation in the Holocaust under Vichy France.

== Critical response ==
Emma Hagestadt, writing in The Independent, said that "the late Brian Moore's 18th novel is also one of his best – a gripping moral thriller based on the real life story of Paul Touvier, 'the torturer of Lyon'" and described it as "Tautly written and steeped in atmosphere".

== Film adaptation ==
The novel was adapted into a 2003 film, directed by Norman Jewison and starring Michael Caine and Tilda Swinton. The screenplay was written by Ronald Harwood.
