= François Ducaud-Bourget =

French priest (1897–1984)

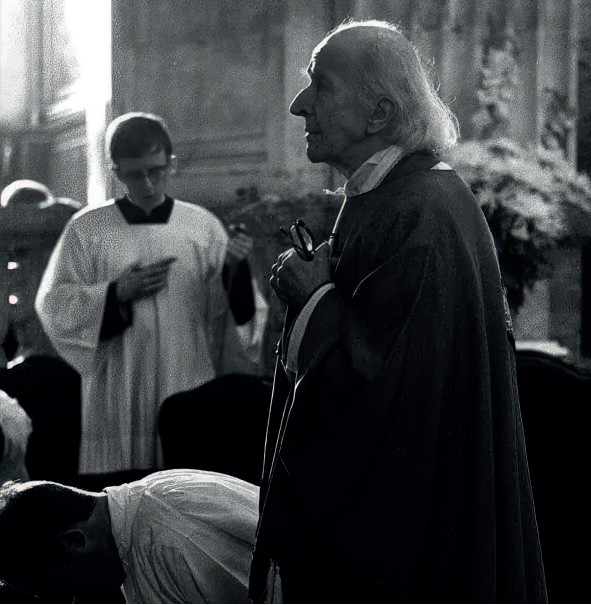
Msgr. Ducaud-Bourget offering Mass in the Tridentine Rite in Paris

Monsignor François Ducaud-Bourget (November 24, 1897 – June 12, 1984) was a prominent traditionalist Roman Catholic French prelate, priest and close ally of Archbishop Marcel Lefebvre.

== French resistance ==
Ducaud-Bourget was born in Bordeaux. During World War II, he was active in the French Resistance as a priest, and helped Jews to escape to Spain. He was decorated by the government of Charles de Gaulle for his work.

He had been made a chaplain of the Order of Malta in 1946 and an honorary prelate in the time of Pope Pius XII. He was probably deprived of this title later, though public documentation is unclear.

== Second Vatican council ==
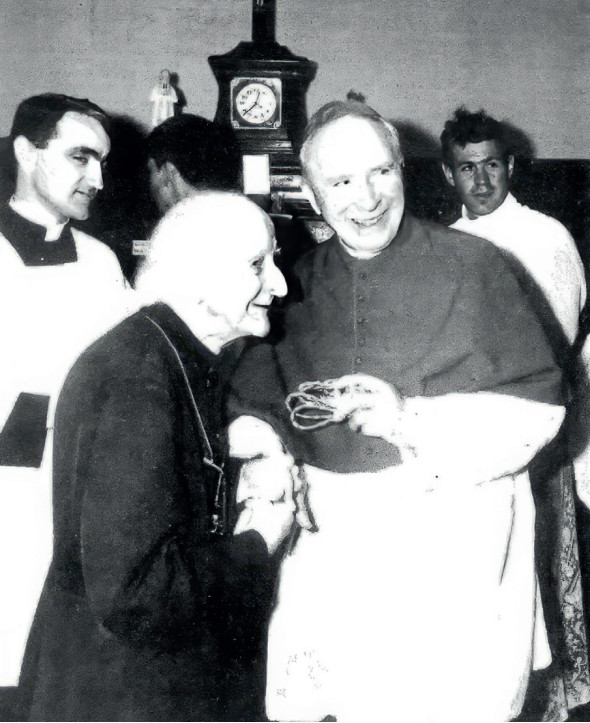
Msgr. Ducaud-Bourget with Archbishop Lefebvre at St. Nicolas-du-Chardonnet.

Rejecting the revision of the Roman Missal that followed the Second Vatican Council, he organised celebration of the Latin Tridentine Mass in the chapel of the Hôpital Laënnec, a former hospital in Paris. When he was excluded from this in 1971, he tried in vain to obtain from the Cardinal Archbishop of Paris François Marty another place in which only the Tridentine Mass would be celebrated. When he failed in this, he continued to celebrate mass in rented rooms for several years. He then organised the take-over, on 27 February 1977, of the parish church of Saint-Nicolas-du-Chardonnet, expelling the priest in charge.

When he died at Saint-Cloud in 1984, aged 86, he was buried in the church of Saint-Nicolas-du-Chardonnet, which has a portrait bust of him over his tomb. He was succeeded in charge the church by Father Philippe Laguérie, who later founded the Institute of the Good Shepherd.

== In popular culture ==
In his Le Cercle d'Ulysse, Jean Delaude presents Ducaud-Bourget as the successor of Jean Cocteau as "Nautonnier" (Grand Master) of the Priory of Sion.
