= The Dear Departed: Selected Short Stories =

2020 collection of short stories by Brian Moore

- Author: Brian Moore
- Cover artist: e-Digital Design
- Publisher: Turnpike Books
- Publication date: 2020 (paperback)
- Publication place: United Kingdom
- Pages: 102
- ISBN: 9781916254701
- OCLC: 9576110698
- Preceded by: The Magician's Wife (1997)

The Dear Departed: Selected Short Stories is a collection of short stories by Northern Ireland-born novelist Brian Moore. It was published in the United Kingdom by Turnpike Books in 2020, 21 years after his death.

== Contents ==
Story title	When first published	Where first published	Subsequent re-publication
"A Vocation"	Autumn 1956	Tamarack Review 1, pp. 18–22	Threshold 2 (Summer 1958) pp. 21–25 Garrity, Devin A (ed.) The Irish Genius (1960). New York: Signet Books Threshold 21: An Anthology of Ulster Writing (1967) pp. 49–53
"Grieve for the Dear Departed"	August 1950	The Atlantic	Pudney, John (ed.) Pick of Today's Short Stories, no. 12 (1960). London: Putnam, pp. 179–188
"Uncle T"	November 1960	Gentleman's Quarterly	Moore, Brian. Two Stories (1978). Northridge, California: Santa Susana Press
"Lion of the Afternoon"	November 1957	The Atlantic	Cornhill 170, 1958 Pacey, Desmond (ed.) A Book of Canadian Stories (1962). Toronto: Ryerson Press, pp. 283–293
"Fly Away Finger, Fly Away Thumb"	September 1953	London Mystery Magazine	Haining, Peter (ed.) Great Irish Tales of Horror (1995). London: Souvenir Press, pp. 227–236
"Off the Track"	1961	Weaver, Robert (ed.) Ten for Wednesday Night (1961). Toronto: McClelland and Stewart, pp. 159–167	Rimanelli, Giose; Ruberto, Robert (eds.) Modern Canadian Stories (1966). Toronto: Ryerson Press, pp. 239–246
"Hearts and Flowers"	24 November 1961	The Spectator	
"Preliminary Pages of a Work of Revenge"	Winter 1961	Midstream 7, pp. 57–61	Montrealer, December 1961, pp. 27–29 Ploughshares 2, 1974, pp. 28–32 Montague, John; Kinsella, Thomas (eds.) The Dolmen: Miscellany of Irish Writing (1962). Dublin: Dolman, pp. 1–7 Richler, Mordechai (ed.) Canadian Writings Today (1970). Harmondsworth: Penguin Books, pp. 135–145 Moore, Brian. Two Stories (1978). Northridge, California: Santa Susana Press

== Reception ==
Reviewing the book in The Spectator, Wendy Erskine said: "[T]he stories of this collection display the concerns that would preoccupy the Belfast-born Moore throughout his career — those attempts to abandon the values and constraints of the past, to escape conservative, authoritarian homes... But leaving aside any relationship to future output, these are, simply, great stories. In ‘Uncle T’, a young Irish emigrant and his bride find that the ‘publishing’ job offered by a relative and his wife in New York is not all it seems. The story is deft, nuanced and notable in the way it elicits sympathy for all four main characters...There is delightful variety. A super-natural tale of Sicilian bandits has shades of Hammer House of Horror, and is no less enjoyable for that. ‘Lion of the Afternoon’ presents a variety show performed for children with disabilities. Written in 1957, its language is undeniably of the time, but it’s a beautiful, sad and compassionate story of difference and identification."

Writing in The Irish News, James Doyle said that "Moore's short stories are as restless in their variety as his novels". Although several of them share many of the themes and atmosphere of Moore's novel Judith Hearne, "they are more consciously influenced by Joyce and give an insight into Moore’s own feelings about his father and life as an emigrant... Other stories from The Dear Departed display a humorous side to Moore. They include the supernatural tale of a Sicilian bandit who kidnaps a magician – it could be one of Roald Dahl’s Tales of the Unexpected – while the most joyous story allows Moore to take comic revenge on religion and express the freedom he found in Canada."

== Sources ==
- Crowley, Michael. "A Brian Moore Bibliography" in The Canadian Journal of Irish Studies, Vol. 23, No. 2 (Dec 1997), pp. 89–121. DOI: 10.2307/25515225
