= W. Sydney Robinson =

British biographer and book reviewer (born 1986)

W. Sydney Robinson is a British biographer and book reviewer.

== Biographer ==
He is the authorised biographer of writer and dramatist Sir Ronald Harwood. The book Speak Well of Me: the authorised biography of Ronald Harwood was published by Oberon Books in May 2017 and charts Harwood's life from his impoverished childhood as part of a large Jewish family in South Africa to his years of success in the West End and Hollywood. Reviewing the book in The Times of London, theatre critic Benedict Nightingale described it as "engaging" and "entertaining". The reviewer in The Jewish Chronicle, however, described it as "wincingly florid" and "egregious".

== Published works ==
Robinson has published biographies of the Victorian investigative journalist W. T. Stead, Muckraker: the scandalous life and times of Britain's first investigative journalist, and a group biography of William Joynson-Hicks, 1st Viscount Brentford, Dean Inge, John Reith, 1st Baron Reith and Arthur Bryant, The Last Victorians: a daring reassessment of four twentieth century eccentrics. Muckraker was awarded the Political Biography of the Year Award at the 2013 Total Politics and Paddy Power Political Book Awards and was included in the 'Books of 2012' selection in The Sunday Times. In a review of The Last Victorians in The Spectator, biographer and historian Philip Ziegler commented that 'Robinson has real talent'. In 2021, Robinson followed up his earlier work on Bryant with a work of literary non-fiction based on correspondence of the historian with a number of his former secretaries and lovers. This book, entitled Historic Affairs: the Muses of Sir Arthur Bryant, contained revelations about Bryant's private life that were described as "jaw-dropping" in a review by Adam Sisman in The Spectator.

Robinson has reviewed books in The Sunday Times, the TLS, the Spectator and the Literary Review.

== Life ==
He lives in Northamptonshire and teaches full-time at Oundle.
