= The Statement (2003 film) =

2003 film by Norman Jewison

- DVD cover
- Directed by: Norman Jewison
- Screenplay by: Ronald Harwood
- Based on: The Statement by Brian Moore
- Produced by: Norman Jewison; Robert Lantos
- Starring: Michael Caine; Tilda Swinton; Jeremy Northam; Alan Bates; William Hutt; John Neville; Charlotte Rampling
- Cinematography: Kevin Jewison
- Edited by: Andrew S. Eisen; Stephen E. Rivkin
- Music by: Normand Corbeil
- Production companies: Serendipity Point Films; BBC Films; Odessa Films; Company Pictures; Astral Media; Corus Entertainment; Movision
- Distributed by: Sony Pictures Classics (United States, Australia and New Zealand); ThinkFilm (Canada); BAC Films (France); Momentum Pictures (United Kingdom); Summit Entertainment (International)
- Release dates: 12 December 2003 (limited); 27 February 2004 (UK)
- Running time: 120 minutes
- Countries: Canada; France; United Kingdom; United States
- Language: English
- Budget: $27 million
- Box office: $1.6 million

The Statement is a 2003 drama thriller film directed and produced by Norman Jewison, from a screenplay by Ronald Harwood, based on the 1996 novel by Brian Moore. It stars Michael Caine, Tilda Swinton, Jeremy Northam, Alan Bates, William Hutt, John Neville and Charlotte Rampling.

The film is inspired by the true story of Paul Touvier, a Vichy French police official who was indicted after World War II for ordering the execution of seven Jews in retaliation for the French Resistance's assassination of Vichy France minister Philippe Henriot. For decades after the war, he escaped trial thanks to an intricate web of protection, which allegedly included senior members of the Roman Catholic priesthood. He was arrested in 1989 inside a Traditionalist Catholic priory in Nice and was convicted in 1994. He died in prison in 1996, at the age of 81.

An international co-production of Canada, the United Kingdom, France, and the United States, The Statement was released in Canada on December 12, 2003. It received mixed-to-negative reviews from critics, though it won Best Overall Sound and Best Sound Editing at the 24th Genie Awards. The Statement is the last film by Jewison before his retirement and death in 2024. It was also Bates's final theatrical role before his death in the year of the film’s release.

== Plot ==
Pierre Brossard, a French Nazi collaborator, orders seven Jews executed during World War II. Some 40 years later, he is pursued by David Manenbaum, a hitman who is under orders to kill Brossard and leave a printed statement on his body proclaiming the assassination was vengeance for the Jews executed in 1944. Brossard kills Manenbaum, hiding the dead body after finding the statement and discovering that his pursuer was travelling on a Canadian passport. Brossard, for years, has taken refuge in sanctuaries in southern France within the Traditionalist Catholic community, appealing to long-time allies who have operated in great secrecy to shield him and provide him with funds. But now they bring increased scrutiny to themselves for continuing to do so.

The murder of Manenbaum attracts the interest of local police and eventually the persistent Investigating Judge Annemarie Livi. She becomes absorbed by the case, not discouraged by the lack of assistance she encounters from official sectors. Livi allies with the similarly dedicated Colonel Roux, a senior French Gendarmerie investigator, and the pair initially suspect that Manenbaum was part of a Jewish assassination plot. They discover that Brossard has been the subject of several previous investigations, dating back more than 40 years, which have all failed. Livi and Roux discover hidden resources, tightening the noose around Brossard, who finds his allies increasingly reluctant to help him.

Brossard, in desperation, pays a surprise visit to his estranged wife Nicole, a maid who is living in lower-middle-class circumstances in Marseille and is very apprehensive about seeing him again. Brossard's allies, including certain priests and a wartime colleague who has risen into a position of great power within the French government, are feeling the heat from the relentless questioning of Livi and Roux. Now desperate and unsure whom to trust, Brossard seeks new identity papers and money so he can escape France forever. On the night he is to escape, however, his handler, Pochon, shoots him dead on orders from his former protectors within the government, who fear he will cause trouble for them if captured.

Following Brossard's death, Livi and Roux trace the conspiracy to protect him to a high-ranking government official and arrest him for treason.

== Cast ==
- Michael Caine as Pierre Brossard
- Tilda Swinton as Anne-Marie Livi
- Jeremy Northam as Colonel Roux
- Alan Bates as Armand Bertier
- John Neville as The Old Man
- Charlotte Rampling as Nicole
- Ciarán Hinds as Pochon
- Frank Finlay as Commissaire Vionnet
- Matt Craven as David Manenbaum
- Noam Jenkins as Michael Levy
- Colin Salmon as Patrice
- Joseph Malerba as Max

== Historical basis ==
The Statement is based on the best-selling 1995 novel of the same name by Brian Moore. In the novel and film, the fictional Brossard is based on Paul Touvier, a member of the Milice, a paramilitary police force of the Vichy French regime during World War II, who ordered the execution of seven Jews in 1944. After the war, he was convicted of treason and sentenced to death in absentia, but with the aid of right-wing Roman Catholic clergymen, who provided him refuge in safe houses and monasteries, Touvier avoided capture. He received a controversial pardon from the President of France, Georges Pompidou, in 1971, but remained on the run. Unlike Brossard, Touvier was finally arrested in 1989, on a new charge of crimes against humanity; tried, convicted, and sentenced to life in prison, he died in jail in 1996, aged 81.

== Reception ==
The film holds an approval rating of 24% on review aggregator website Rotten Tomatoes based on 106 reviews, with an average rating of 4.7/10. The site's consensus reads: "The movie bores despite a splendid performance by Michael Caine." Metacritic, which uses a weighted average, assigned the film a score of 45 out of 100, based on 32 critics, indicating "mixed or average" reviews. The film grossed a little over $765,000 domestically and $1.55 million worldwide in its limited release against a budget of $27 million.
