= The Magician's Wife (Moore novel) =

1997 novel by Brian Moore

- First edition (Canada)
- Author: Brian Moore
- Genre: Historical novel
- Publisher: Knopf (Canada); Bloomsbury (UK); Dutton (US)
- Publication date: 1997
- Publication place: United Kingdom
- Media type: Print
- Pages: 215
- ISBN: 978-0-7475-3718-2
- OCLC: 247666817
- Preceded by: The Statement (1995)
- Followed by: The Dear Departed: Selected Short Stories (2020)

The Magician's Wife, published in 1997, was the last novel by the Northern Irish-Canadian writer Brian Moore. Set in 1856, it tells the story of a famous French magician (based on the real-life Jean-Eugene Robert-Houdin) who is despatched by Emperor Napoleon III to help France subdue the Arab population in war-torn Algeria.

== Reception ==
Reviewing the book for The New York Times, Thomas Mallon said: "Combining actual and invented figures requires a particular sleight of hand, and in The Magician's Wife Moore accomplishes this mingling without giving any glimpse of a false bottom or secret compartment... The Magician's Wife, combining so many of Moore's longtime preoccupations and themes, proves to be one of his neatest tricks yet." Brian St. Pierre in the San Francisco Chronicle described it as a "deft and absorbing novel". John Muncie, reviewing the novel for the Baltimore Sun, said that The Magician's Wife "plays with French history and the power of illusion... Moore writes with propulsive clarity. The reader is immediately entangled."
