= Glaeser's composition theorem =

In mathematics, Glaeser's theorem, introduced by Georges Glaeser (1963), is a theorem giving conditions for a smooth function to be a composition of F and θ for some given smooth function θ. One consequence is a generalization of Newton's theorem that every symmetric polynomial is a polynomial in the elementary symmetric polynomials, from polynomials to smooth functions.
