= Institute of the Good Shepherd =

Roman Catholic society of apostolic life

Coordinates: 44°50′8″N 0°34′15″W

- Institutum a Bono Pastore
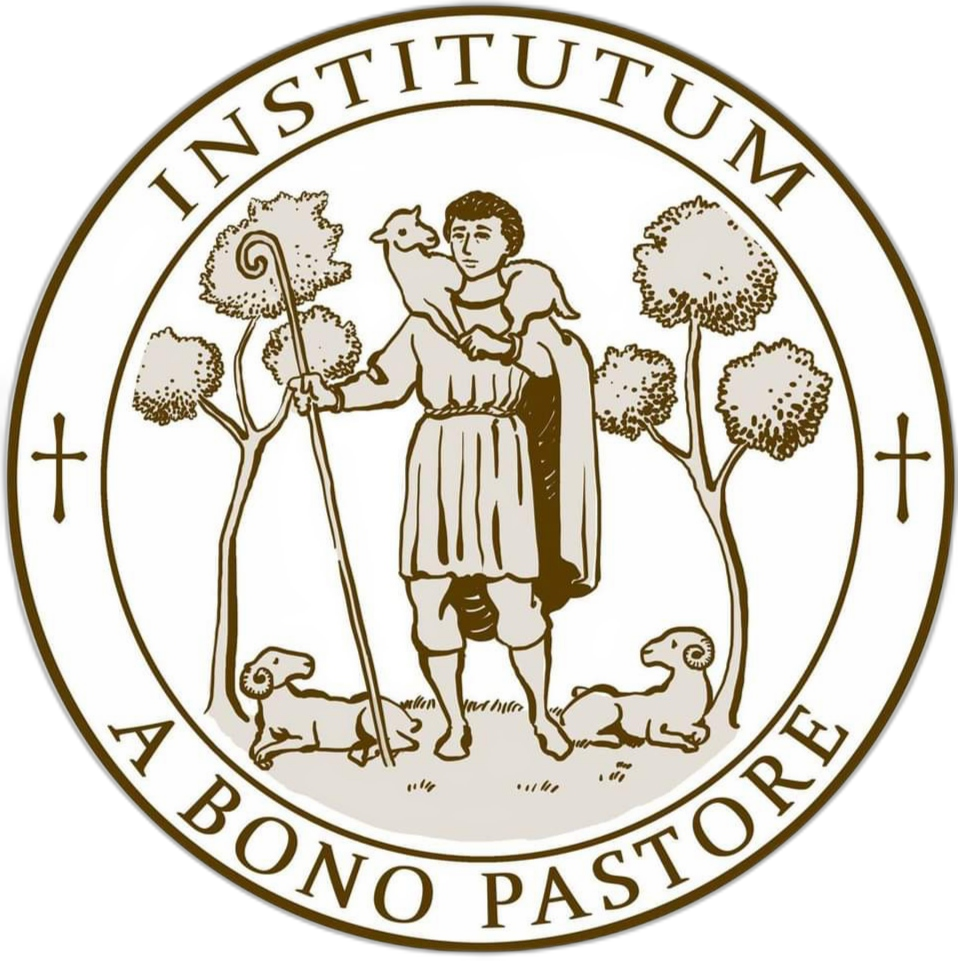
- Abbreviation: I.B.P.
- Formation: November 8, 2006; 20 years ago
- Type: Roman Catholic Clerical Society of Apostolic Life of Pontifical Right
- Location: Courtalain, Eure-et-Loir
- Members: 62 priests; 5 deacons; 50 seminarians
- Superior General: Luis Gabriel Barrero Zabaleta
- Website: instituteofthegoodshepherd.org

The Institute of the Good Shepherd (French: Institut du Bon Pasteur, Latin: Institutum a Bono Pastore) is a Catholic society of apostolic life made up of traditionalist priests promoting the Tridentine Mass and other traditional sacraments in full communion with the Holy See. As of 2024, the institute has 62 priests, 5 deacons and 50 seminarians (of 12 nationalities) and is active in 10 countries over 4 continents.

== Background ==
Father Paul Aulagnier, who had been provincial superior of the Society of Saint Pius X in France from 1976 to 1994, was expelled from the society in 2004 for having spoken in favour of the 2002 agreement between the Holy See and the priests of Campos, Brazil, who form the Personal Apostolic Administration of Saint John Mary Vianney. These priests, however, accepted the hermeneutics of continuity of Pope Benedict XVI, while the priests of the Institute of the Good Shepherd were authorised by the Vatican to use the Tridentine form of the Roman Rite exclusively and criticized the reforms of the Second Vatican Council. Aulagnier, for example, published through the Montfort Cultural Association a book in Portuguese defending Archbishop Marcel Lefebvre and his traditionalist claims.

In August 2004, Father Philippe Laguérie was expelled for having complained that the Society of Saint Pius X had serious problems which discouraged priestly vocations in its seminaries. As a disciplinary measure he had been transferred to Mexico, but refused the assignment.

Laguérie had for many years been in charge of the church of Saint-Nicolas-du-Chardonnet in Paris, occupied by the Society of St Pius X since 1977. In 1993, he made an attempt to take over another Paris church, the Church of Saint-Germain-l'Auxerrois. He carried out the operation successfully at Bordeaux, obtaining the approval of the city council, but not of the archbishop's office, to take over the church of Saint-Eloi in January 2002.

Father Christophe Héry was expelled for supporting Laguérie, as was Father Guillaume de Tanoüarn. The latter was the founder of the religious association of Saint-Marcel and the Saint-Paul Centre in Paris.

On 15 June 2006, a French court in Nanterre (chambre du Tribunal de grande instance de Nanterre) ordered the reinstatement of Laguérie and Héry.

== Foundation ==
They had already decided to embark on a new path (while, according to at least one of them, remaining members of the Society of St Pius X). On 8 September 2006, the liturgical feast of the Nativity of Mary, they, together with Father Henri Forestier, who also was stationed in Bordeaux, formed the Institute of the Good Shepherd, a society of apostolic life in full communion with the Holy See. Several seminarians joined the new fraternity, some of them close to ordination. Cardinal Darío Castrillón Hoyos, who signed the decree approving their constitutions for a preliminary experimental period of five years, promised to confer the sacrament of orders on them.

Father Laguérie had declared in March 2006 that agreement with the Holy See was required by the very constitution of the Catholic Church, and he asked his parishioners to take note of the signs of good will on the part of Rome and of its intention to put an end to the doctrinal turmoil and the scandals of 1960–2000. He pointed to an address of Pope Benedict as a condemnation of using "the spirit of the Council" as a pretext for excesses.

== Agreement with the Holy See ==
The Holy See granted the members of the new institute use, as the institute's own rite, of the "Tridentine" form of the Roman Rite, employing the 1962 Roman Missal. For their part, each of the founding members personally undertook to respect the authentic Magisterium of the See of Rome with "complete fidelity to the infallible Magisterium of the Church". The members of the institute may engage in a criticism of the Second Vatican Council that is serious and constructive and in accord with Pope Benedict XVI's address of 22 December 2005 to the Roman Curia, while recognizing that it is for the Apostolic See to give the final authentic interpretation.

== Present situation ==
Over a period of less than five months, until 6 February 2007, membership grew to ten priests and two deacons (one close to priestly ordination) incardinated in the institute and listed by name on Father Laguérie's blog. In its two formation houses it also had a not-yet-incardinated deacon, a subdeacon and eight other seminarians. There was one brother (a lay member of the institute). The ordination on 3 March 2007 added another two priests, while maintaining the number of deacons at two. Priests from many places were requesting incardination, but the institute exercised prudence in their regard.

Cardinal Castrillón fulfilled the promise he made when the institute was founded and on 22 September 2007 ordained five priests of the institute, one of whom was a former member of the Society of St. Pius X. The archbishop of Bordeaux and president of the French episcopal conference, Jean-Pierre Ricard, was present.

In September 2009, the institute had in France a house of formation for its seminarians studying philosophy, and a residence in Rome for its students of theology. It had eight Mass centres in France and one in each of five other countries: Chile, Colombia, Italy, Poland and Spain. It also had three schools. The Reparative Slaves of the Holy Family had come into existence with three religious sisters taking the veil.

In 2015, the institute opened a house in Rome, Casa San Clemente.

In 2021, Bishop Peter A. Libasci erected a personal parish of the institute in Winchester, New Hampshire.

The institute is currently active in 10 countries (France, Poland, Italy, Portugal, Spain, Brazil, Colombia, the United States, Uganda, Australia) on four continents.

== Latin America District ==
On 1 November 2006, Father Rafael Navas Ortiz was nominated superior for the Latin America District.

There were unconfirmed rumours in February 2008 that Cardinal Francisco Javier Errázuriz Ossa, Archbishop of Santiago in Chile, ordered the institute to cease celebrating the Tridentine Mass and leave the country. It is not authorized to celebrate the Tridentine Mass publicly in Santiago and his celebrations are therefore of private character, as permitted by the motu proprio Summorum Pontificum.

In March 2011, an independent chapel located in Bogota, Colombia, was officially incardinated into the institute by the Archbishop of Bogota, and is now officially recognized by the archdiocese. The priest of the chapel has been given faculties to say public Masses and hear confessions.

In Brazil the institute has houses in Brasília, São Paulo, Belém and Curitiba. Besides, there are several apostolates in other major cities.

== See also ==
- Traditionalist Catholicism
- Consecrated life
- Society of Saint Pius X
- Priestly Fraternity of Saint Peter
- Institute of Christ the King Sovereign Priest
- Preconciliar rites after the Second Vatican Council
- Institutes of consecrated life
- Religious institute
- Secular institute
- Vocational Discernment in the Catholic Church
