= Paul Touvier =

French Nazi collaborator (1915–1996)

- Born: Paul Claude Marie Touvier; 3 April 1915; Saint-Vincent-sur-Jabron, Basses-Alpes, France
- Died: 17 July 1996 (aged 81); Fresnes Prison, Fresnes, France
- Other name: Paul Berthet
- Conviction: Crimes against humanity
- Penalty: Life imprisonment (1994)
- Career
- Spouse: Monique Berthet (m. 1947–1996; his death)
- Children: 2
- Allegiance: Vichy France: Head of the intelligence department in the Chambéry Milice
- Branch: Milice
- Service years: 1943–1945

Paul Claude Marie Touvier (French pronunciation: [pɔl tuvje]; 3 April 1915 – 17 July 1996) was a French Nazi collaborator and war criminal during World War II in Occupied France. In 1994, he became the first Frenchman convicted of crimes against humanity, for his participation in the Holocaust under Vichy France.

== Early life ==
Paul Claude Marie Touvier was born on 3 April 1915 in Saint-Vincent-sur-Jabron, Alpes de Haute-Provence, in southeastern France. His family was devoutly Roman Catholic, lower-middle-class and extremely conservative. He was one of 11 children, and the oldest of the five boys. He served as an altar boy when he was young, and attended a seminary for a year, intending to become a priest.

Touvier's mother, Eugenie, was an orphan who was raised by nuns. As an adult, she was very religious and went to Mass every day. She died when Touvier was a teenager. His father, François Touvier, was a tax collector in Chambéry, after having retired after serving as a career soldier for 19 years. Touvier's father was very conservative, an admirer of the monarchist and anti-parliamentarist Charles Maurras and L'Action Française.

Paul Touvier graduated from the Institute Saint Francis de Sales in Chambéry at the age of 16. When he turned 21, his father got him a job as a clerk at the local railroad station, where he was working when World War II began. Touvier was mobilized for the war effort in 1939. After the Vichy government was created, Touvier and his family were firm supporters of its leader Philippe Pétain. Father and son joined the Vichy veterans' group when it was founded in 1941.

== War years ==
Joining the French 8th Infantry Division, Touvier fought against the German Wehrmacht until, following the bombing of Chateau-Thierry, he deserted. Touvier returned to Chambéry in 1940, which was then occupied by the Kingdom of Italy. His life took a new course after the Milice (the Vichy French militia) was established.

Touvier had become known for womanizing and for trading in the black market. Disgusted by his son's libertine lifestyle, his devoutly Catholic father persuaded him to join the Milice, hoping that a little military discipline would "make a man out of his son."

Touvier was eventually appointed head of the intelligence department in the Chambéry Milice under the direction of the Gestapo and SD, serving as a subordinate. In January 1944 he became its second regional head.

In Paris on 28 June 1944, 15 members of the Résistance, dressed as members of the Milice, assassinated Vichy France Minister for Propaganda Philippe Henriot as he slept in the Ministry building where he lived and worked. As it was suspected that the assassins were from Lyon, Touvier was ordered to conduct reprisal killings. On 30 June, Touvier found seven French Jewish prisoners already in custody, and had them executed by firing squad.

== Post-liberation ==
After the liberation of France by the Allied forces, Touvier went into hiding; he escaped the summary execution suffered by many suspected collaborators during the épuration sauvage. On 10 September 1946, the government sentenced him to death in absentia for treason and collusion with the Nazis. In 1947, he was arrested for armed robbery in Paris, but escaped.

== Fugitive ==
By 1966, implementation of his death sentence was barred based on a 20-year statute of limitations. Attorneys for Touvier filed an application for a pardon. They requested that the lifetime ban on leaving the country and the confiscation of goods linked to capital punishment be lifted. In 1971, French President Georges Pompidou granted Touvier the pardon.

Pompidou's pardon caused a public outcry. This increased when it was revealed that most of the property which Touvier claimed as his own had allegedly been seized from deported Jews.

On 3 July 1973, Georges Glaeser filed a complaint against Touvier, charging him with crimes against humanity, which had no statute of limitations. Glaeser charged Touvier with ordering the deaths of the seven prisoners whom he had executed in 1944 after Henriot's assassination, one of whom was Glaeser's father. After being indicted, Touvier disappeared again. Years of legal maneuvering ensued through his lawyers until a warrant was issued for his arrest on 27 November 1981.

== Arrest ==
On 24 May 1989, Touvier was arrested at the Society of Saint Pius X (SSPX) priory in Nice. The SSPX said at the time that Touvier had been allowed to live in the priory as "an act of charity to a homeless man".

== Death ==
On 17 July 1996, Paul Touvier died of prostate cancer at the age of 81 in Fresnes Prison, near Paris. A Tridentine Requiem Mass was offered for the repose of his soul by Father Philippe Laguérie at St Nicolas du Chardonnet, the Society of St. Pius X chapel, in Paris. He was survived by his widow, Monique (died 2018), and their two children.

== In popular culture ==
The Irish-Canadian novelist Brian Moore's 1995 novel, The Statement, is loosely based on Touvier's life. It was adapted as a film, also titled The Statement (2003), directed by Norman Jewison. Michael Caine appeared as Pierre Brossard, a character inspired by Touvier.

An episode of the History Television series Nazi Hunters, first broadcast on 1 November 2010, documented the 1989 efforts of French authorities to find and arrest Touvier.

== Brel connection ==
For several years, the Belgian singer Jacques Brel worked with Touvier. Touvier met Brel by reportedly approaching him in a restaurant and saying, "I am Paul Touvier, a condemned man." Touvier was the producer of a sex-education record for French families, issued by Philips, which included tracks sung by Brel. Brel's wife, however, said that they knew him only as "Paul Berthet", an alias which he sometimes used, based on his wife's maiden name.

== See also ==
- Maurice Papon
