= Glaeser's continuity theorem =

Characterizes the continuity of the derivative of the square roots of C2 functions

In mathematical analysis, Glaeser's continuity theorem is a characterization of the continuity of the derivative of the square roots of functions of class $C^2$. It was introduced in 1963 by Georges Glaeser, and was later simplified by Jean Dieudonné.

The theorem states: Let $f\ :\ U \rightarrow \R^{+}_0$ be a function of class $C^2$ in an open set U contained in $\R^n$, then $\sqrt{f\,}$ is of class $C^1$ in U if and only if its partial derivatives of first and second order vanish in the zeros of f.
