= Paul Aulagnier =

French Catholic priest (1943–2021)

The Very Reverend Paul Aulagnier
- District Superior of the Society of Saint Pius X in central France
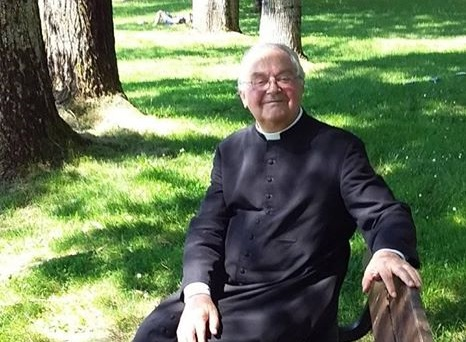
- Aulagnier in 2020

Personal details
- Born: 25 May 1943 Ambert, Vichy France
- Died: 6 May 2021 (aged 77) Périgueux, France

Paul Aulagnier (French: [olaɲe]; 25 May 1943 – 6 May 2021) was a French Traditionalist Catholic priest. Once a member of the Society of Saint Pius X, he then became one of the principal founders of the Institute of the Good Shepherd (French: Institut du Bon Pasteur), an organisation in full communion with the Pope which upholds the Tridentine Mass.

== Career ==
Growing up Aulagnier attended the Clermont Auvergne University, and was then accepted in the Pontifical French Seminary. He was then ordained for the Roman Catholic Archdiocese of Clermont. Being heavily opposed to the Second Vatican Council, Aulagnier became acquainted with fellow Vatican II critic Marcel Lefebvre. When Lefebvre founded the Society of Saint Pius X Aulagnier became one of Lefebvre's most loyal associates, being the superior general for the organization in central France from 1976 to 1994.

Aulagnier was expelled from the Society of Saint Pius X in 2004, for having supported the agreement between the Personal Apostolic Administration of Saint John Mary Vianney and the Vatican, going against his superiors. He subsequently helped found the Institute of the Good Shepherd in 2006. One of the terms in the founding of the Institute of the Good Shepherd that was authorized by the Vatican was to exclusively use the Tridentine Mass and for the organization to oppose many of the reforms of the Second Vatican Council.

In June 2019, Aulagnier bought the Saint-Paul convent in Thiviers in Périgord, abandoned for 20 years, to create a house for spiritual retreats and a training center for pre-seminarians who are part of the Institute of the Good Shepherd.

Aulagnier died in 2021 from COVID-19 aged 78.

== Views ==
Fr. Aulagnier often made statements criticizing democracy and defending monarchies. While still associated with the Society of Saint Pius X, Fr. Aulagnier was quoted in a SSPX periodical in 2001 while serving in a parish in Belgium (which is constitutional monarchy) that "I am pleased to be in Brussels – I who detest the republic and hate democracy."

Even after being expelled by the Society of Saint Pius X, Aulagnier defended the organization's traditionalist views. In 2013 he published a book through the Montfort Cultural Association in Portuguese which defended Archbishop Lefebvre and his traditionalist claims.
