= Philippe Laguérie =

French priest, founder of the Institute of the Good Shepherd

The Very Reverend Philippe Laguérie
- Superior General of the Institute of the Good Shepherd
- Successor: Luis Gabriel Barrero Zabaleta

Orders
- Ordination: 29 June 1979 by Marcel Lefebvre

Personal details
- Born: 30 September 1952 (age 73) Sceaux, Hauts-de-Seine

Philippe Laguérie (born 30 September 1952 in Sceaux, Hauts-de-Seine) is a French Traditionalist Catholic priest. He was the first Superior General of the Institute of the Good Shepherd (French: Institut du Bon Pasteur).

== Career ==
Laguérie was raised in a Roman Catholic family and he studied for the priesthood at the International Seminary of Saint Pius X, in Écône, Switzerland. He was ordained a priest on 29 June 1979 by Marcel Lefebvre, founder of the Society of St. Pius X. In 1984 he succeeded François Ducaud-Bourget as priest in charge of Saint-Nicolas-du-Chardonnet in Paris, and remained there until 1997. In 2002, he moved to Bordeaux where he illegally squatted the Saint-Eloi Church, before he re-examined his situation due to the creation of the Pontifical Commission Ecclesia Dei, which had been established in 1988 by Pope John Paul II to re-establish contacts with the Society of Saint Pius X.

On 16 September 2004, Laguérie was dismissed from the Society by his superior bishop Bernard Fellay. Two years later, on 8 September 2006, he was chosen as leader of the newly founded Institut du Bon Pasteur, which received Pope Benedict XVI's approval, thus regularizing the situation of the Saint-Eloi Church following a signed convention with the archbishop of Bordeaux, Jean-Pierre Ricard. He was reelected for another six years term on 13 August 2013. The Holy See ratified the decision on 13 September 2013.

According to canon law, the Institute of the Good Shepherd is a society of apostolic life dependent both on the Ecclesia Dei Commission and on the Congregation for Institutes of Consecrated Life and Societies of Apostolic Life. It exercises ordinary jurisdiction over the priests who depend on it.

== Controversies ==
In the past, Fr. Laguérie has been connected with the French far right. In 1987, he defended Jean-Marie Le Pen after the latter's controversial remarks on the gas chambers usage in the Second World War and criticized "the great Jewish banking who has held France in a dictatorship for forty-five years". He also claimed that some Holocaust denial theses were "perfectly scientific".

In 1996, Laguérie offered a Requiem Mass for the soul of Paul Touvier at St Nicolas du Chardonnet in Paris. A French Nazi collaborator and the first Frenchman ever convicted of crimes against humanity, Touvier had been a senior Milice official and a high-level perpetrator of the Holocaust in France.

In 2021, he celebrated the Nuptial Mass of far-right leader Jean-Marie Le Pen and his bride Jany, in the presence of various far-right politicians.
