= Saint-Nicolas-du-Chardonnet =

Church of Saint-Nicolas du Chardonnet
- Église Saint-Nicolas du Chardonnet
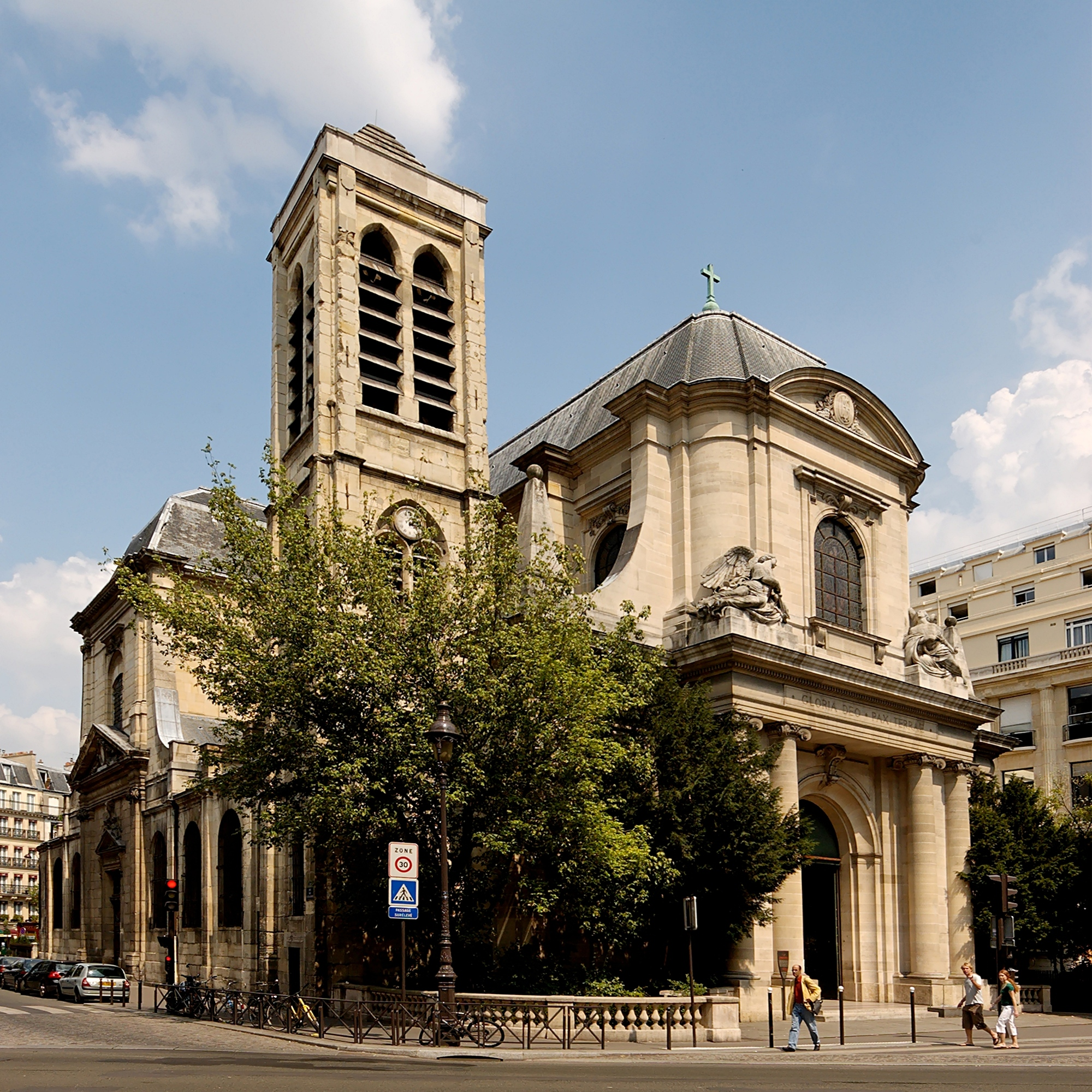

- Location within Paris
- 48.8491°N 2.3502°E
- Location: 23, Rue des Bernardins, 75005 Paris
- Country: France
- Denomination: Catholic Church (de jure); Society of St. Pius X (de facto)
- Website: www.saintnicolasduchardonnet.org

Architecture
- Functional status: Active
- Architectural type: Church
- Style: Classical
- Groundbreaking: 1656
- Completed: 1763

Administration
- Province: Archdiocese of Paris (de jure); Society of St. Pius X (de facto)

Saint-Nicolas du Chardonnet (French pronunciation: [sɛ̃ ni.kɔ.lɑ dy ʃaʁ.dɔ.nɛ]) is a Catholic church in the centre of Paris, France, in the 5th arrondissement. It was constructed between 1656 and 1763. The facade was designed in the classical style by Charles Le Brun. It contains many notable art works from the 19th century, including a rare religious painting by Jean-Baptiste Corot.

Since the expulsion of the parish priest and his assistants by supporters of the SSPX in 1977, the church has been run by the Society of St. Pius X, which celebrates Traditional Latin Masses there.

== History ==
=== Establishment ===
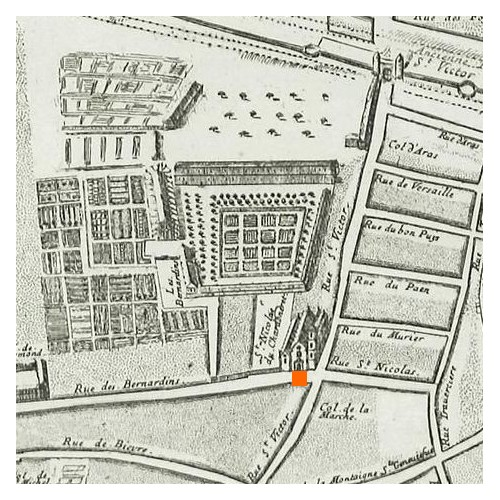
Church on the map of Paris (1676)

A chapel was first built in 1230, in a field planted with chardons (thistles), hence the name. It originally was a dependence of the Abbey of Saint Victor. As the population of the neighbourhood grew, a series of larger churches were built. In 1656, the construction of the present church began, under architects Michel Noblet and François Levé. Due to a shortage of funds, the church was not finished until 1763. Only the bell tower, built sometime before 1600, remains from the earlier church.

In the late 17th century, noted harpsichordist Jean-Nicolas Geoffroy (1633–1694) served as titular organist of the church.

The church was closed and badly damaged during the French Revolution, and most of the art was destroyed. It was gradually replaced with new work by French artists in the 19th century.

Since 1905, the city of Paris, following the enactment of the law on separation of Church and State, claims ownership of the church but grants the Catholic Church a free usage right.

=== 1977 occupation and rededication ===
On 27 February 1977, traditionalist priest Monsignor François Ducaud-Bourget, who opposed the post-Vatican II Mass, organised a meeting of his followers at the nearby Maison de la Mutualité. He led the attendees to Saint-Nicolas church, where a service was just concluding. Ducaud-Bourget entered in procession, went to the altar and said Mass in Latin. The parish priest was ejected. The occupation was intended to be just for the length of the Mass, but then it continued indefinitely. The parish priest went to court and obtained an order for the expulsion of the occupiers, but the application order was delayed pending mediation, with writer Jean Guitton appointed as mediator. After three months of mediation between the occupants and the Archbishop of Paris, François Marty, Guitton admitted his failure to resolve the issue; the police made no attempt to enforce the expulsion order. The occupiers aligned themselves with the Society of Saint Pius X (SSPX), and received help from its leader, Archbishop Marcel Lefebvre.

In 1978, the Court of Cassation confirmed that the occupation was illegal but the order of eviction was never implemented. On 20 February 1987, the Conseil d'État ruled that the disturbance to public order resulting from an expulsion would be higher than that resulting from the illegal occupation.

Ducaud-Bourget died in 1984, and was replaced by Philippe Laguérie. In 1993, the SSPX members, led by Laguérie, unsuccessfully attempted to occupy another church in Paris, St-Germain l'Auxerrois.

In April 2020, during the COVID-19 pandemic, the congregation of Saint-Nicolas defied the social distancing regulations then in force by holding an Easter Vigil. A live stream on YouTube showed the priest and deacons in close contact, without wearing masks, and Holy Communion was given with bare hands. About 40 people were in attendance. The priest was warned and booked, and given a €135 fine.

== Exterior ==
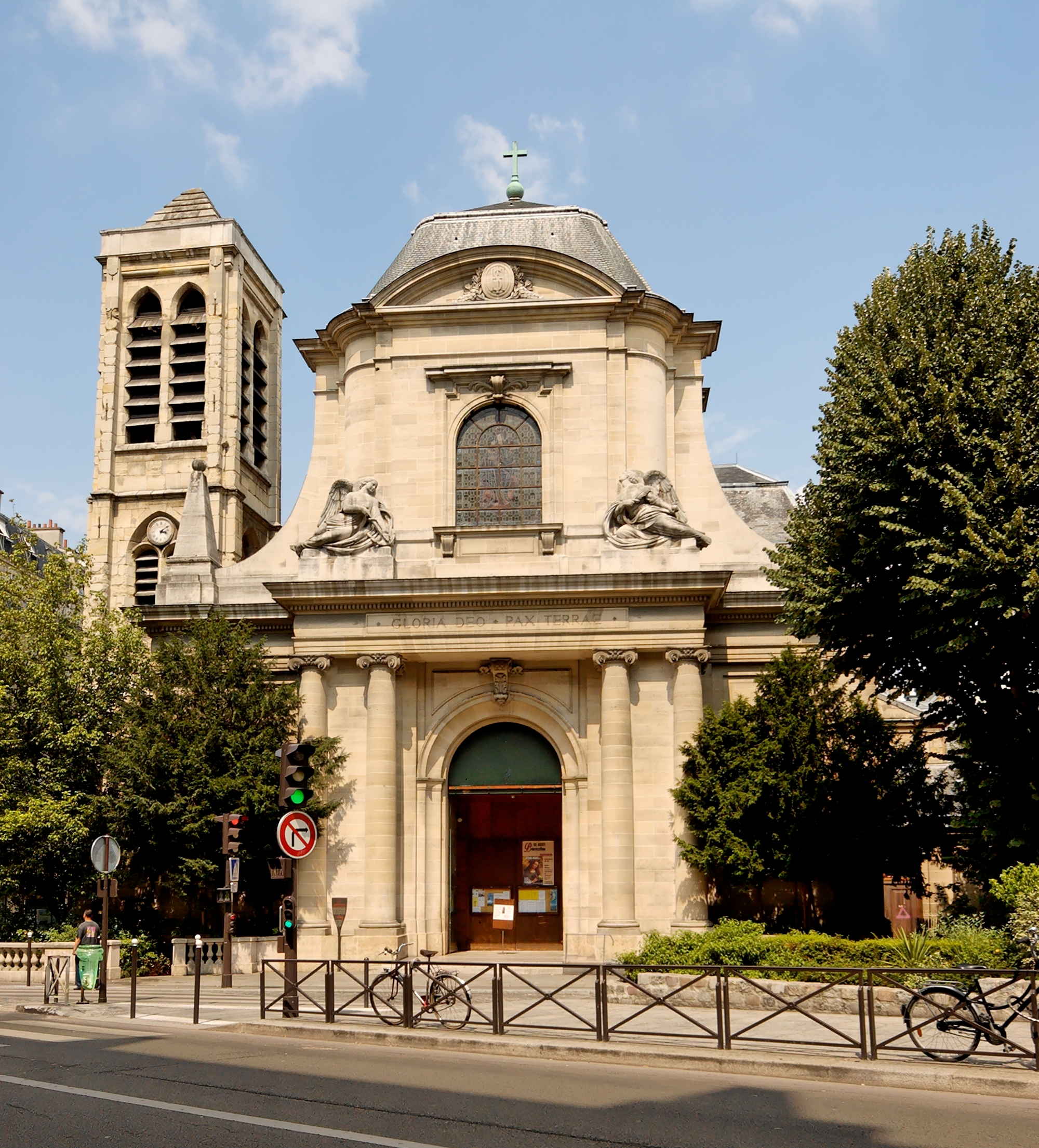
The west front (completed 1937), with main doorway and bell tower

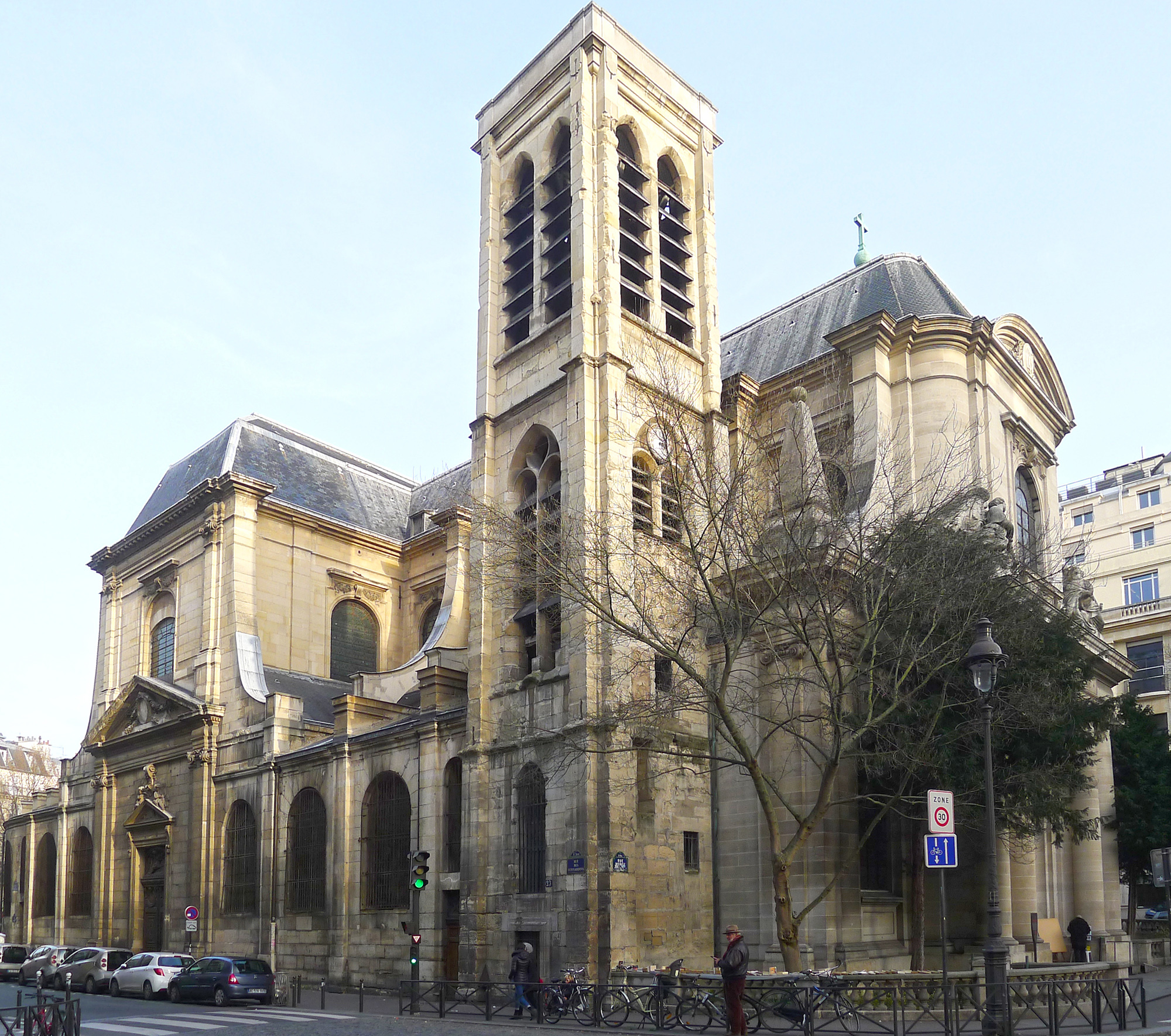
Southwest side of the church along Rue des Bernardins

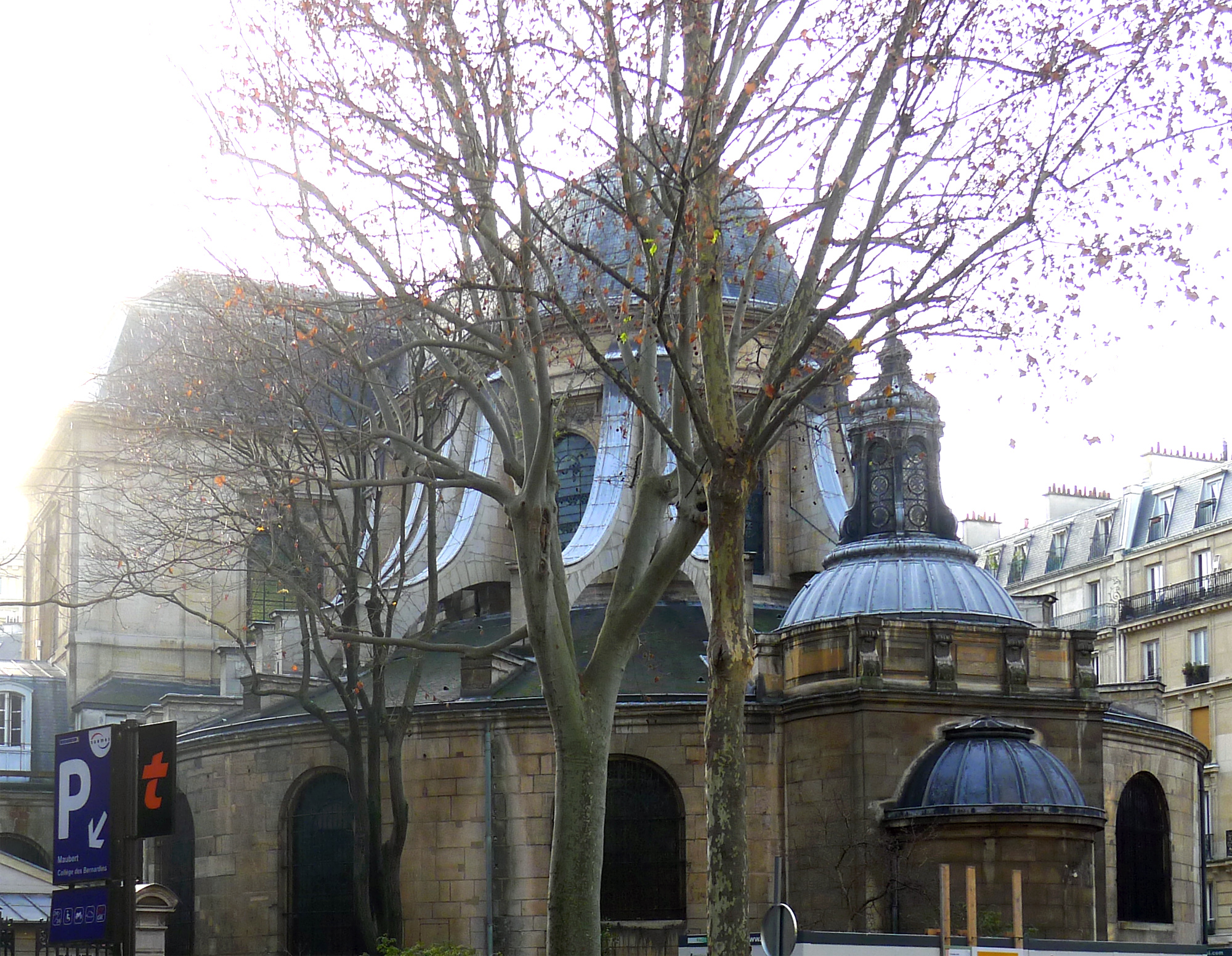
The apse of the church

The construction of the primary facade of the church on Rue Monge, designed by architect Charles Halley, was long unfinished, and was not completed until 1937. It follows the classical style of the rest of the building. The side doorway along the rue des Bernardins, designed by Charles Le Brun, dates to 1669, and is a particularly good example of the classicism of the period. It features pilasters in the Ionic and composite style, triangular frontons or pediments, and sculpted angels. The door, designed by Nicolas Legendre, is richly decorated with carved wreaths and heads of cherubs.

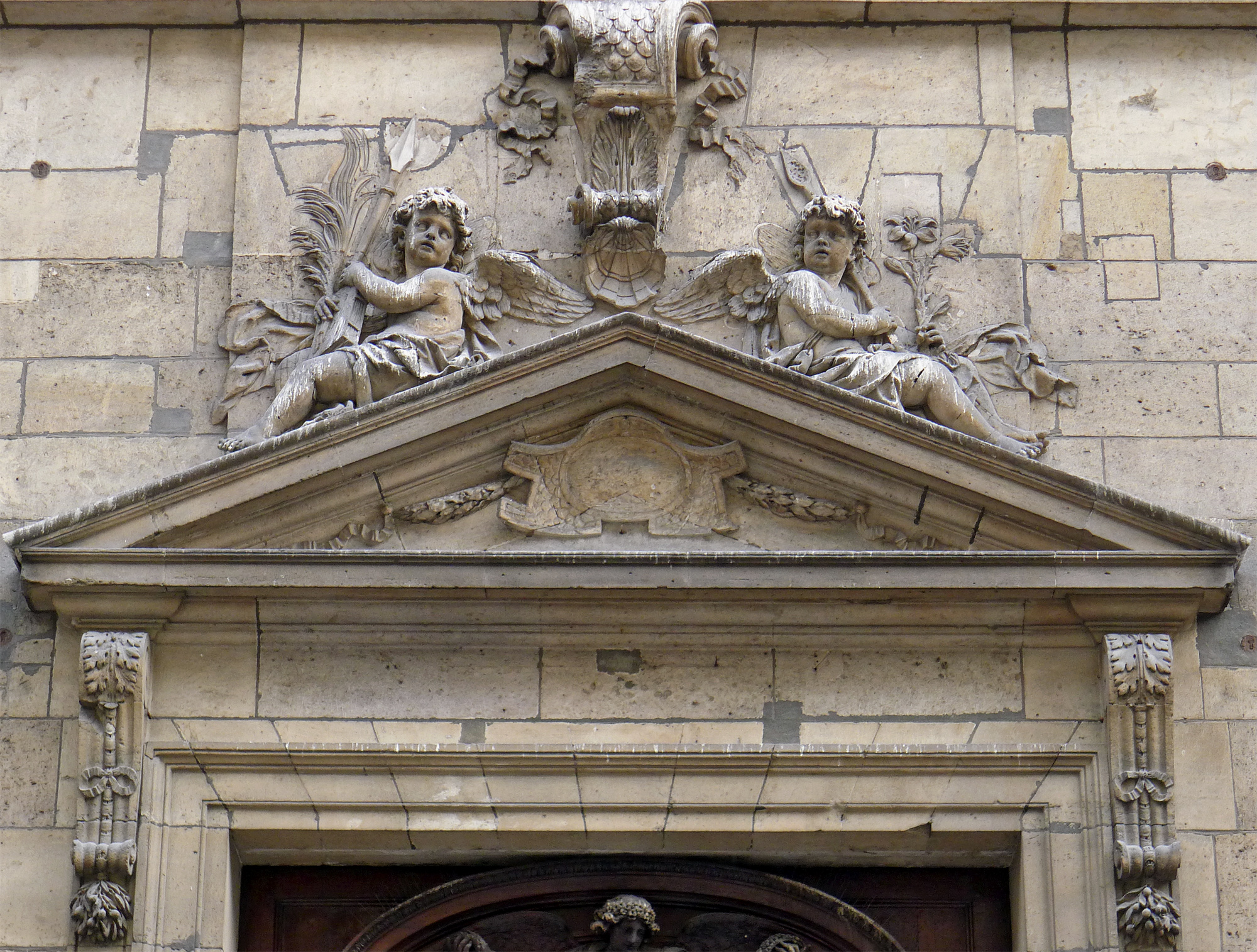
Side portal on rue des Bernardins, by Charles Le Brun (1669)

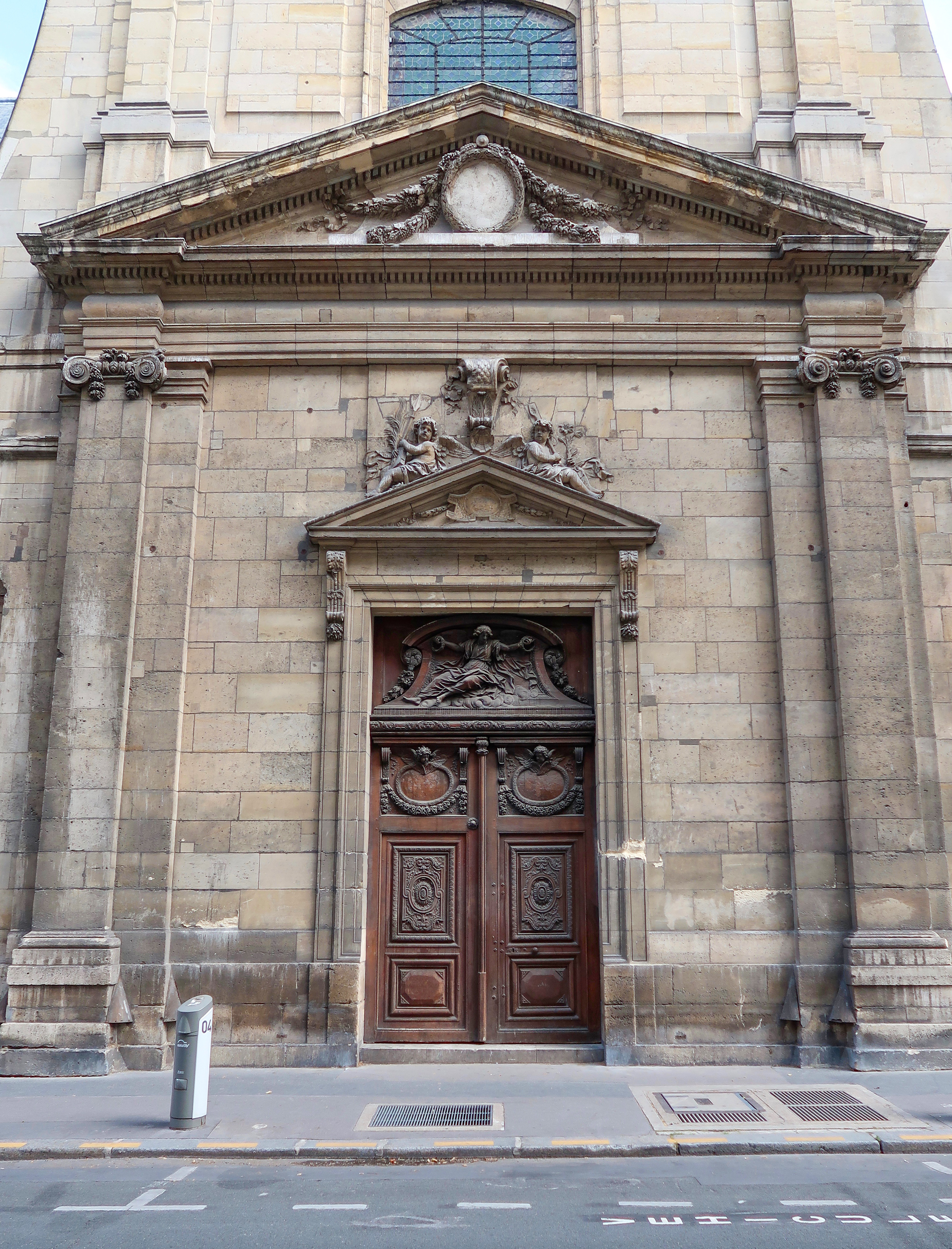
Detail of portal on Rue des Bernardins

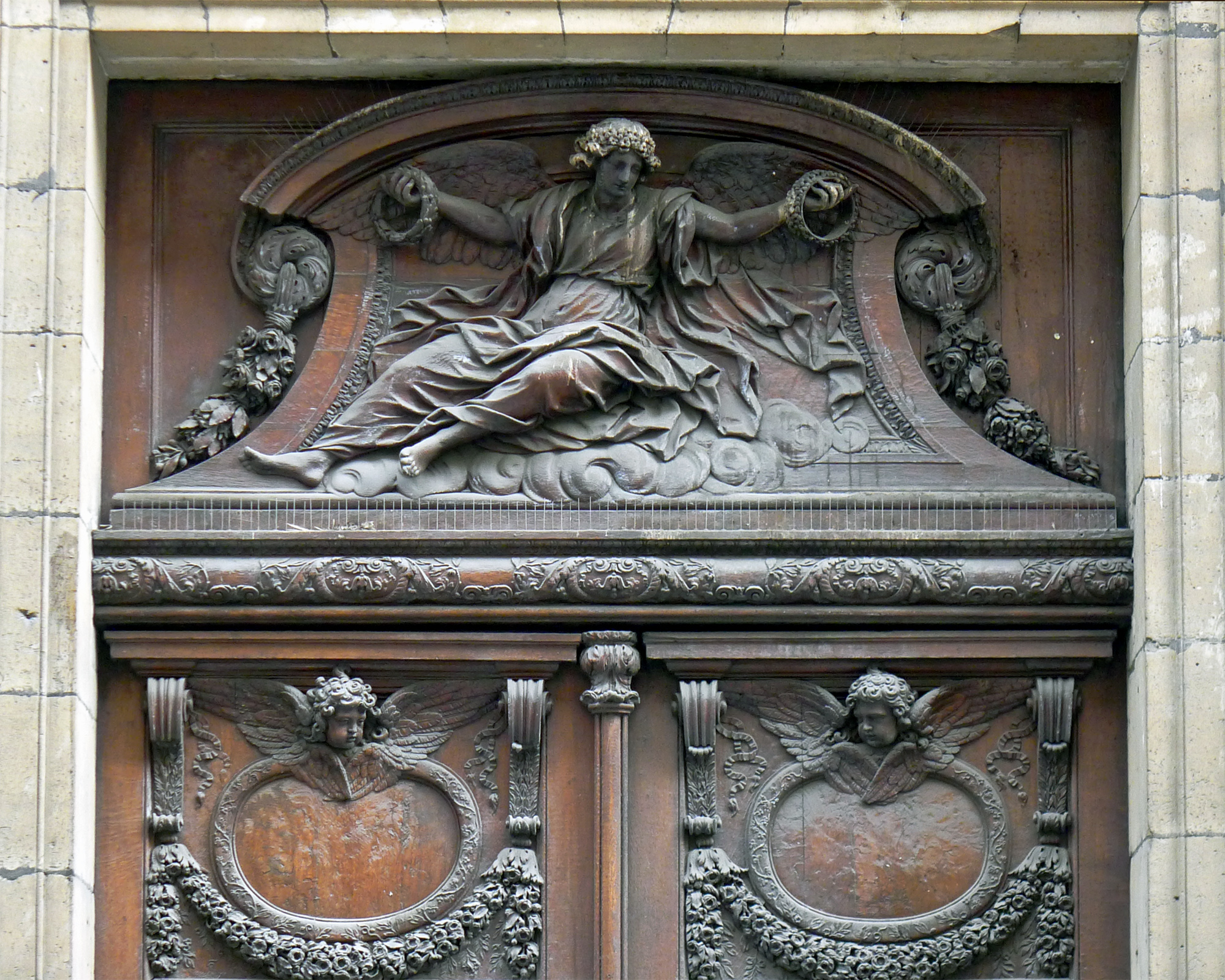
Carvings over the portal on Rue des Bernardins

== Interior ==
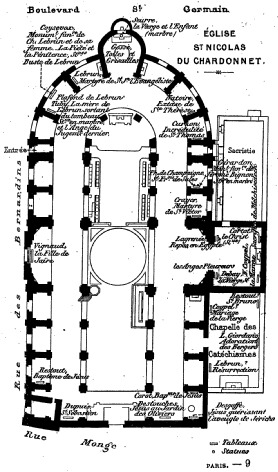
Plan of the church

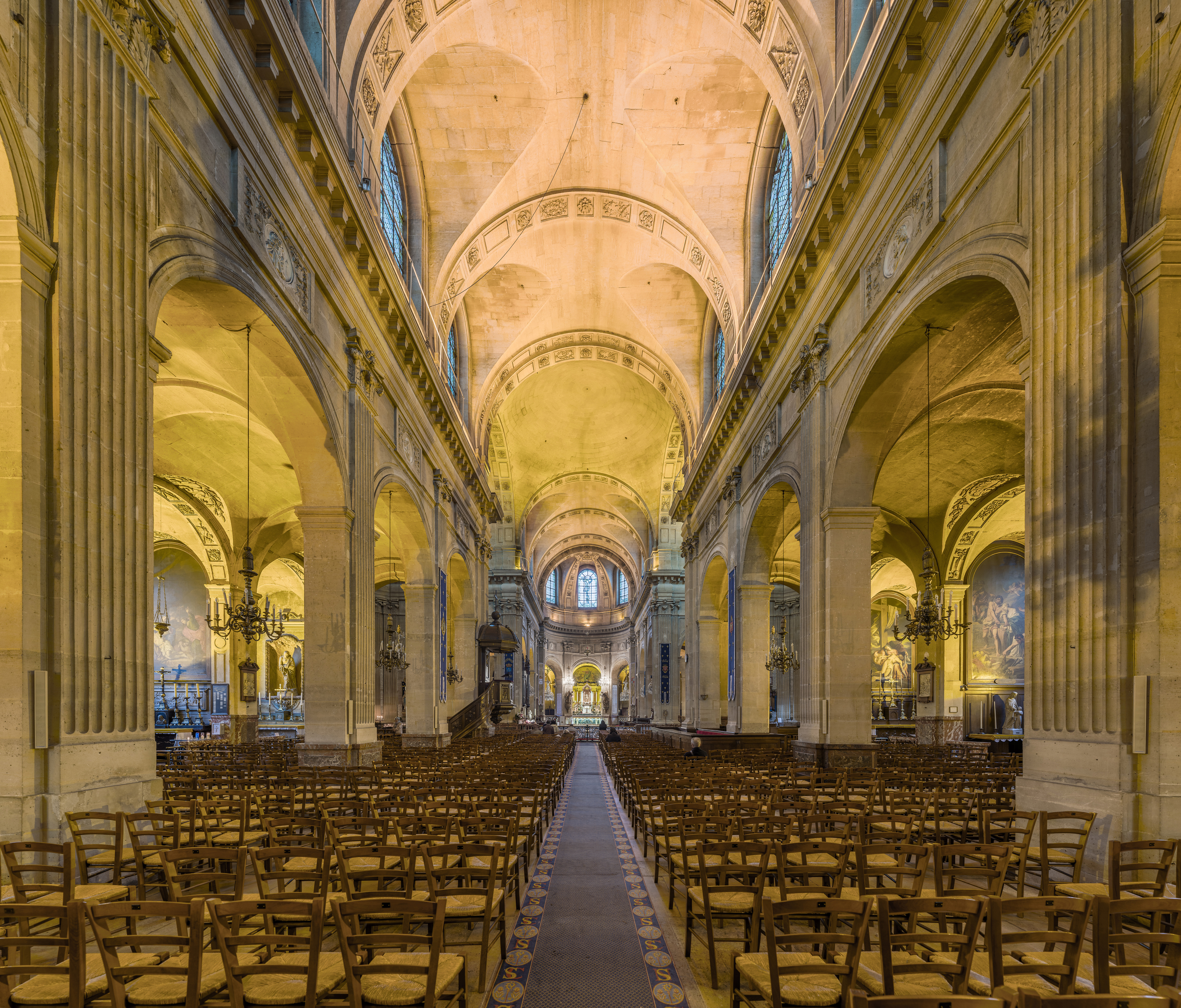
The nave. Note the absence of a "table" altar; Masses are celebrated with priest facing the altar (ad orientem).

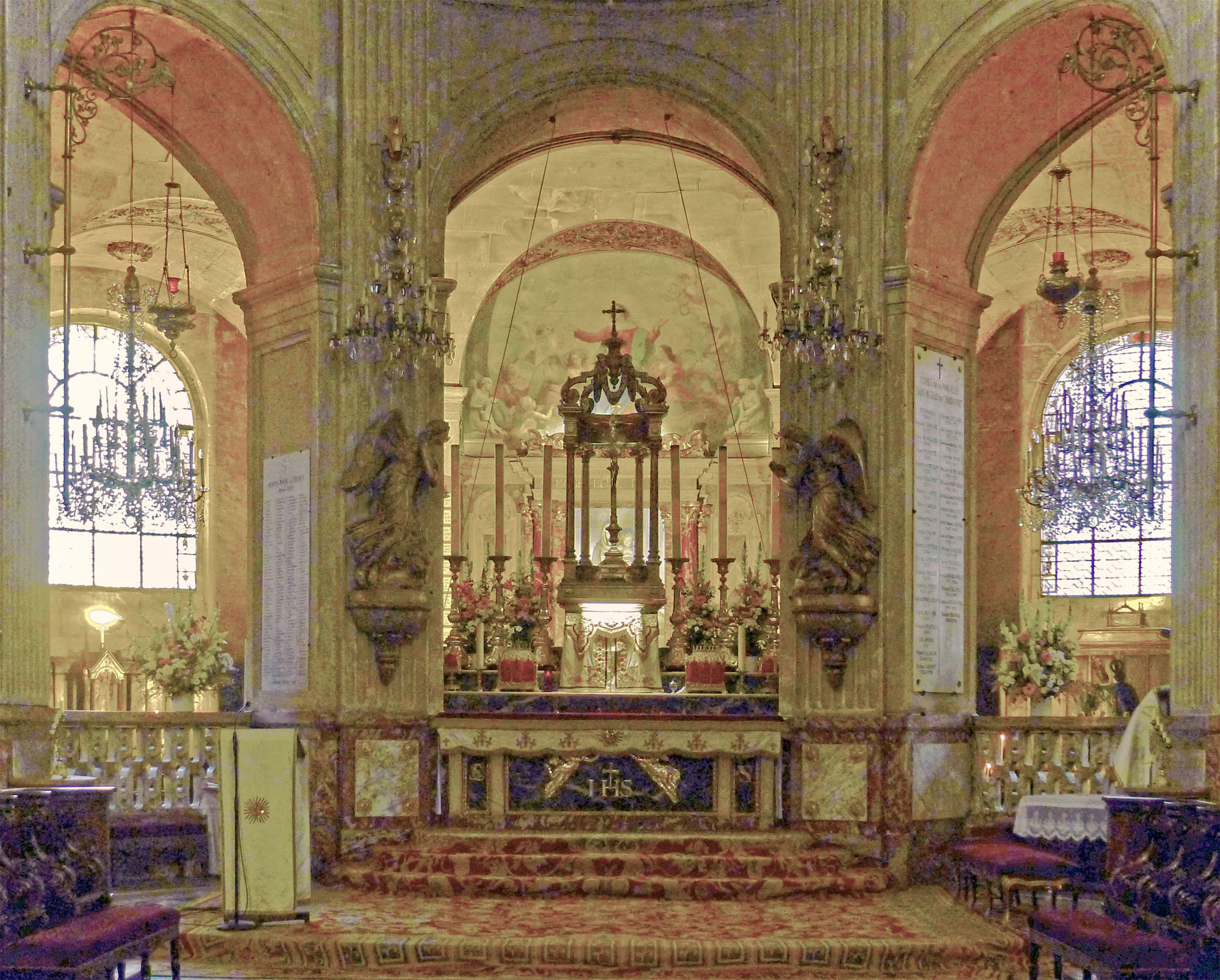
The Altar

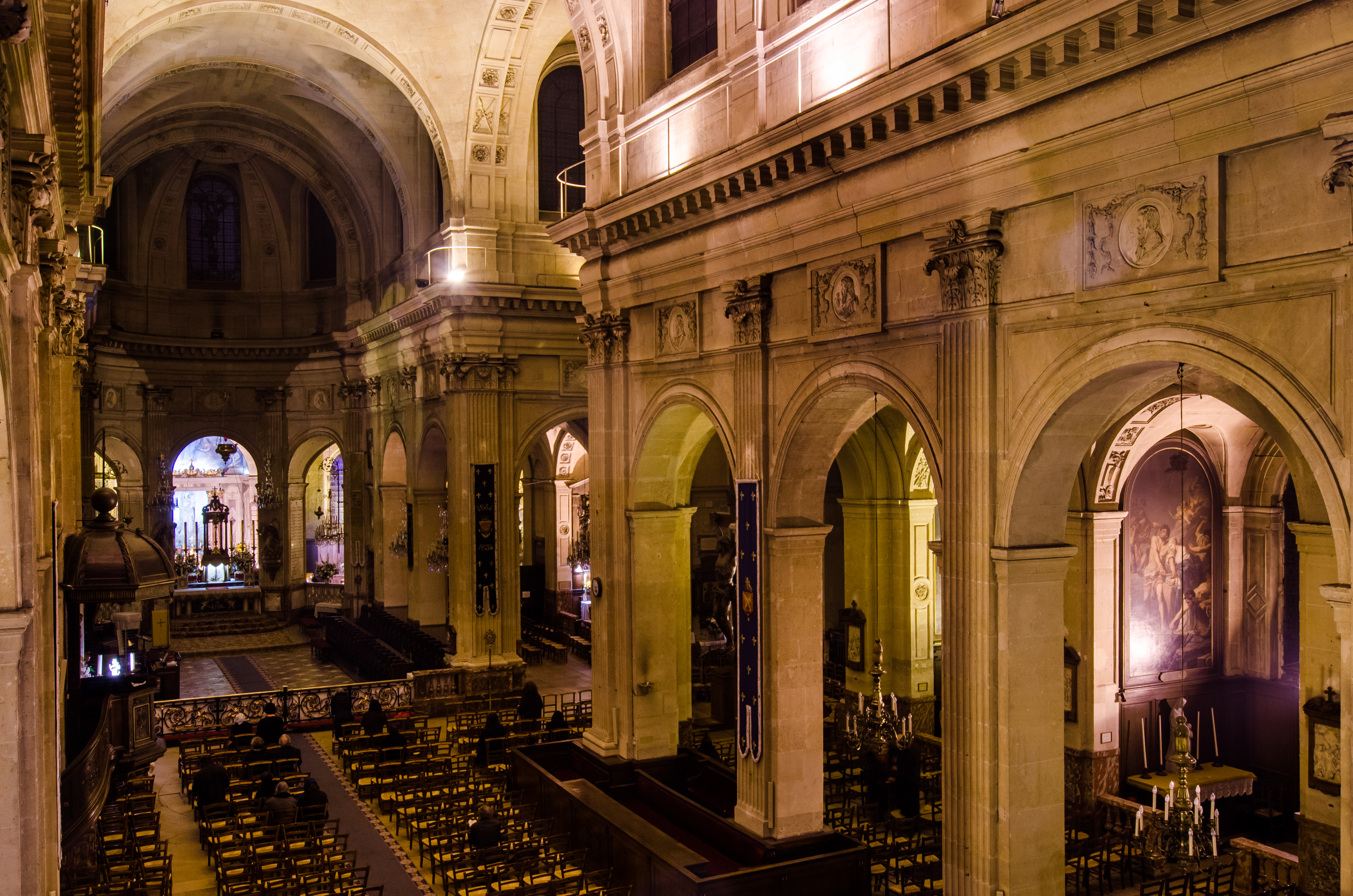
The nave and the choir

The interior of the church is a good example of the Baroque style, lavishly decorated with paintings, medallions and sculpture, dedicated to visually expressing the glory of God. The nave is lined with rows of cruciform pillars, and pilasters with capitals decorated with acanthus leaves in the classical style The arcades that separate the outer aisles from the nave have rounded arches, also in the classical Roman style.

The arrangement of the interior was modified to suit pre-Vatican II liturgical arrangements after 1977 when the church was occupied by the traditionalist Society of St. Pius X. In the pre-Vatican II Tridentine Mass, the priest always celebrates Mass facing east, rather than the congregation, and thus the freestanding "Novus Ordo" altar was removed.

== Art and Decoration - the Chapels ==
=== Chapels of Lower Right Aisle - Le Brun and Corot ===
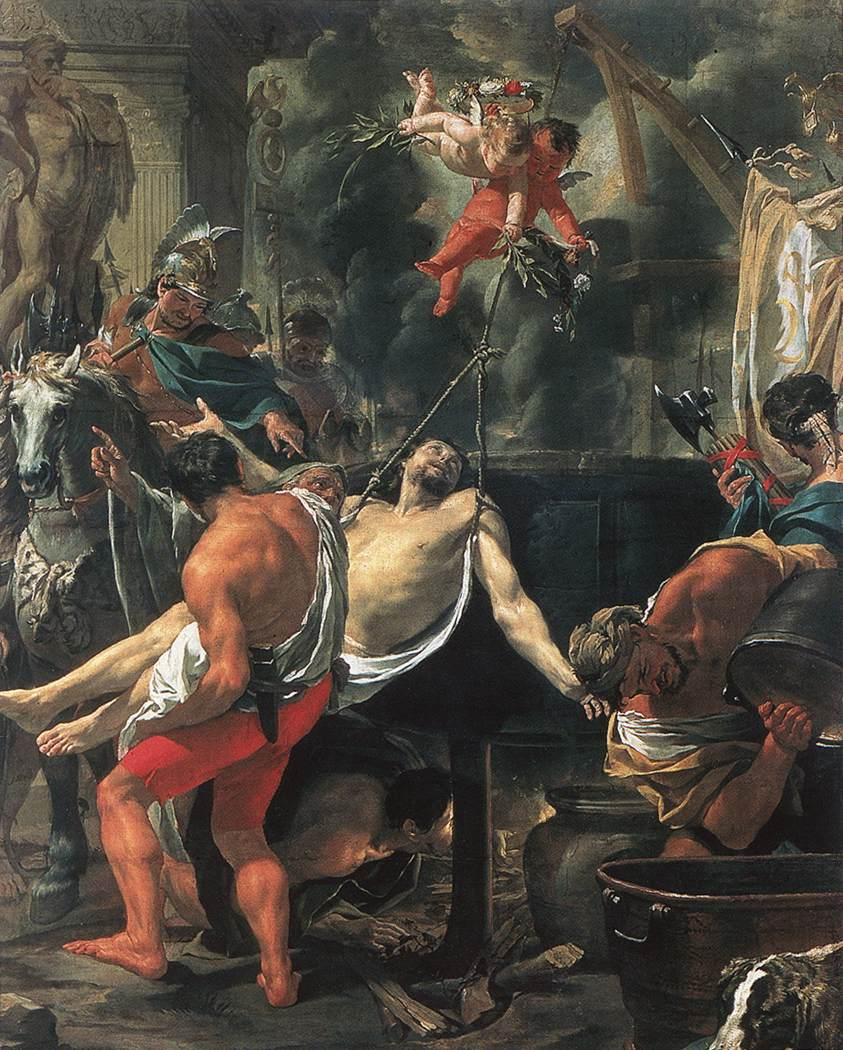
"The Martyrdom of Saint John the Evangelist at the Latin Gate" by Charles Le Brun

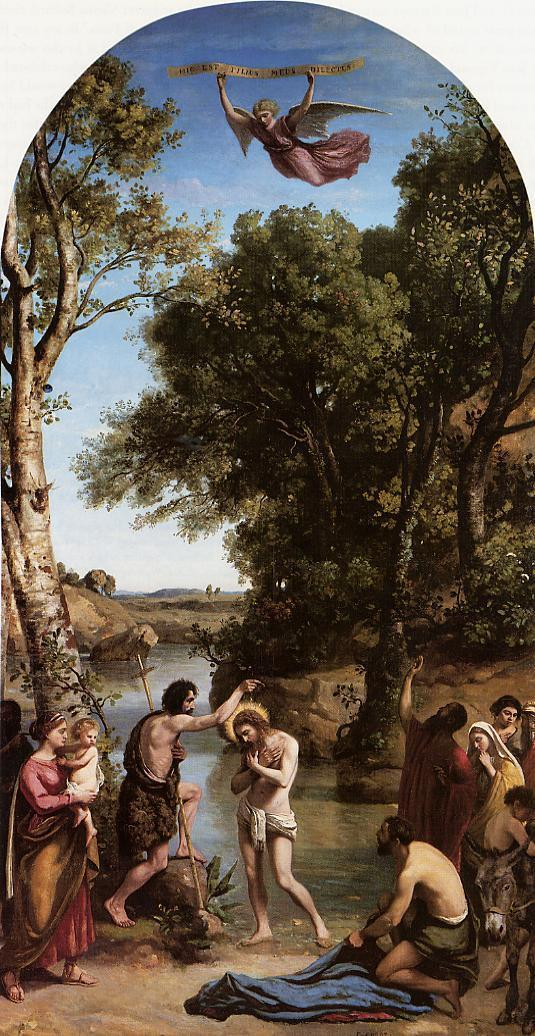
"The Baptism of Christ" by Jean-Baptiste Camille Corot

The chapel in the first traverse displays an early work by Charles Le Brun, called "The Martyrdom of Saint John the Evangelist at the Latin Gate." Le Brun was a student of Simon Vouet, who later became the court painter of Louis XIV. It depicts Saint John, who has been sentenced by the Emperor Diocletian to be thrown into a vat of boiling oil, from which his body emerges unscathed. The painting displays his early skill depicting the human form and the sense of movement.

The Chapel of the Baptismal Fonts displays a rare religious painting by Jean-Baptiste Camille Corot, "The Baptism of Christ". The Baptism itself occupies only the lower third of the painting, and follows the classical style of Nicolas Poussin. The upper two-thirds are occupied by an angel flying above a majestic tree and landscape, the subjects for which Corot became famous. Eugène Delacroix saw the painting in Corot's studio, and described it in his journal as "His grand baptism of Christ, full of naive beauties."

=== Sculpture in the chapels ===
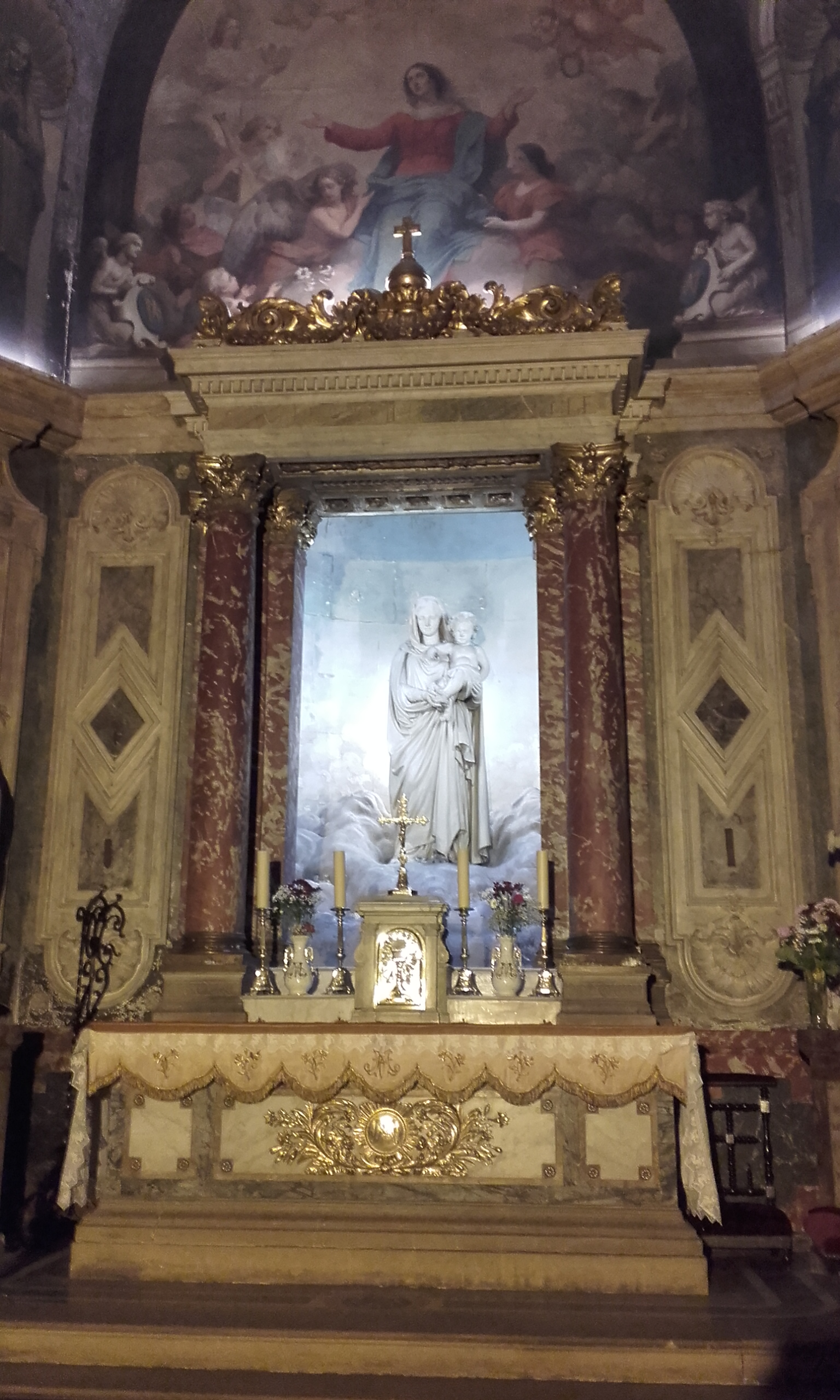
Chapel of the Virgin

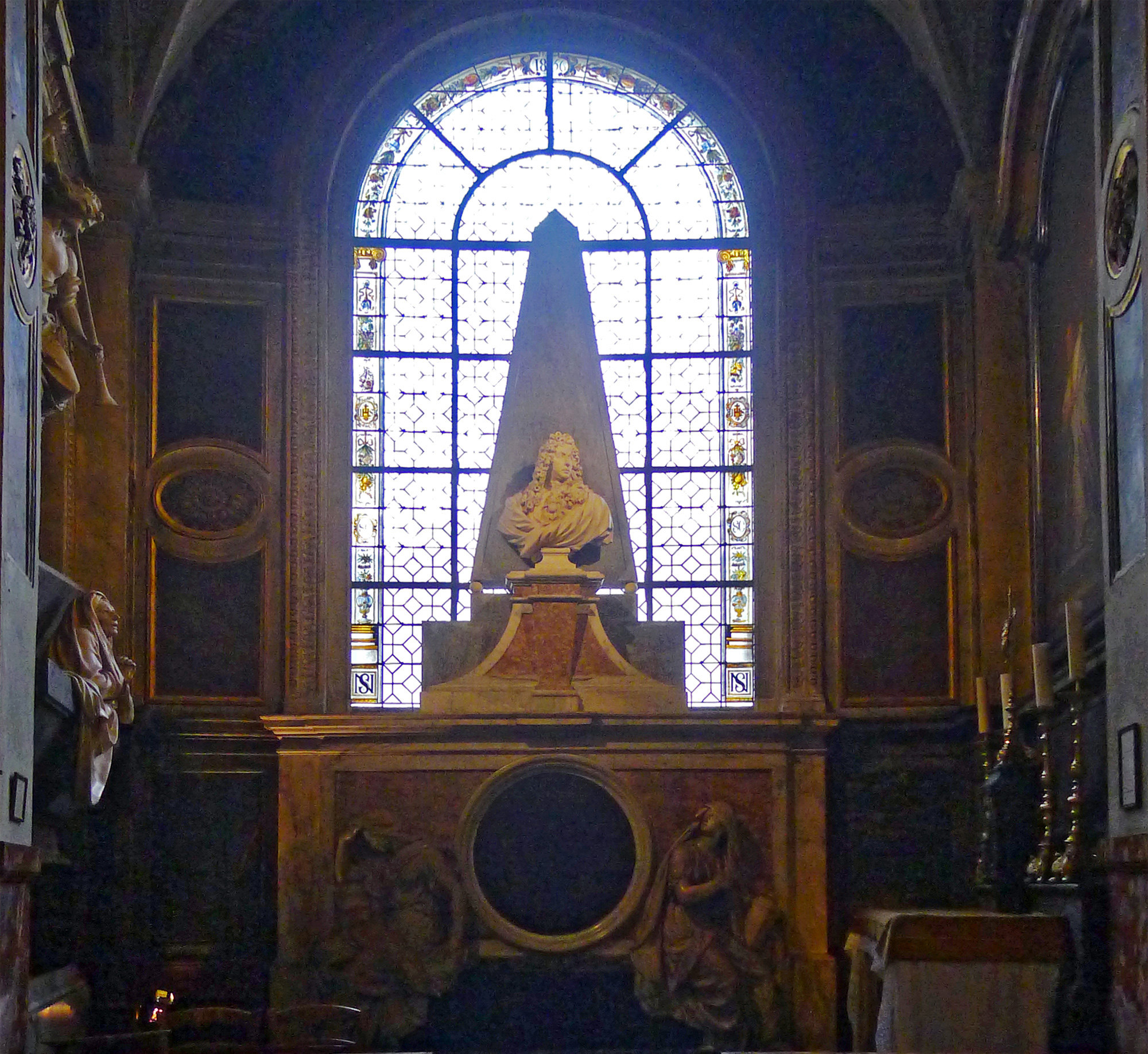
Tomb of the court painter of Louis XIV, Charles Le Brun

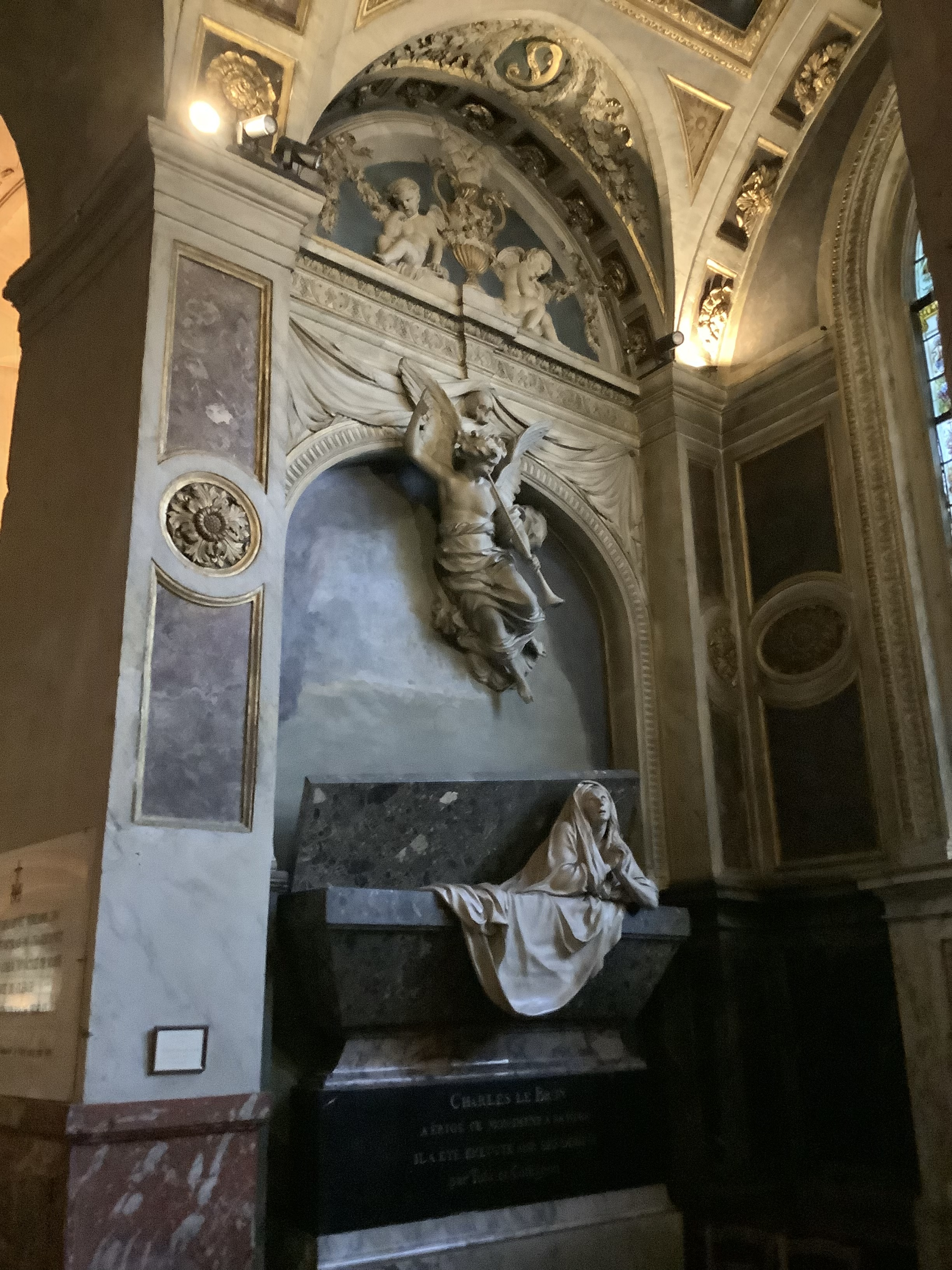
Tomb of Julienne Le Be, mother of Charles Le Brun, by Jean Collington

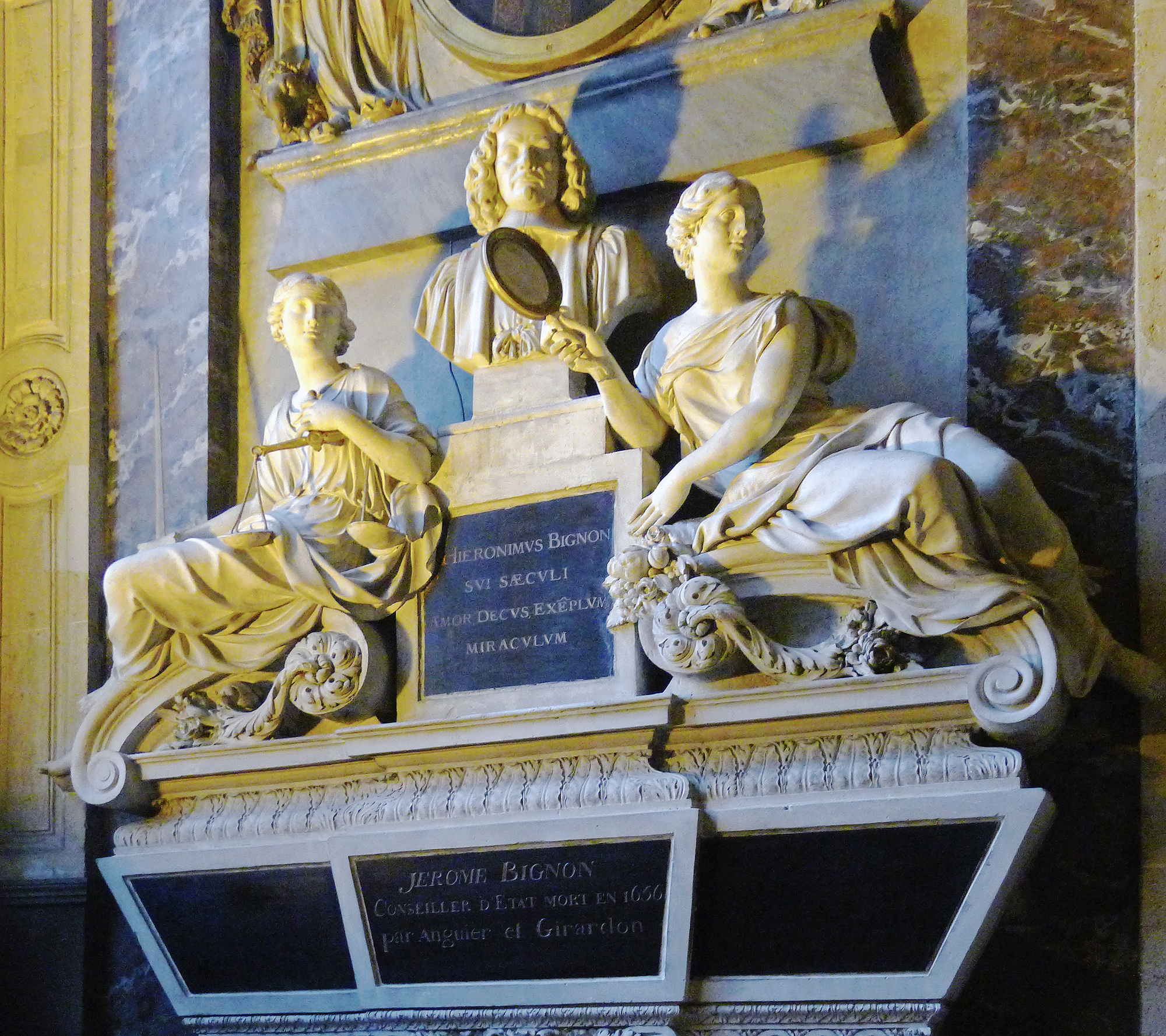
Tomb of Jerome Bignon, tutor of King Louis XIII, by sculptors François Girardon and Michel Anguier

The central feature of the Chapel of Saint-Charles-Boromée is the funeral monument of Charles Le Brun and his wife, Suzanne Butay, made by the sculptor Antoine Coysevox (1640–1720). In the same chapel, the sculptor Jean Collignon (died 1702) created the tomb of Juilienne Le Be, the mother of Le Brun, following a drawing by Le Brun. The composition of the sculpture follows a theme typical of the French Baroque style at the beginning of the 18th century. The deceased is depicted emerging from her tomb, praying, with her eyes upward. Above her is a sculpture of an angel with a trumpet, announcing the Judgement Day and her resurrection.

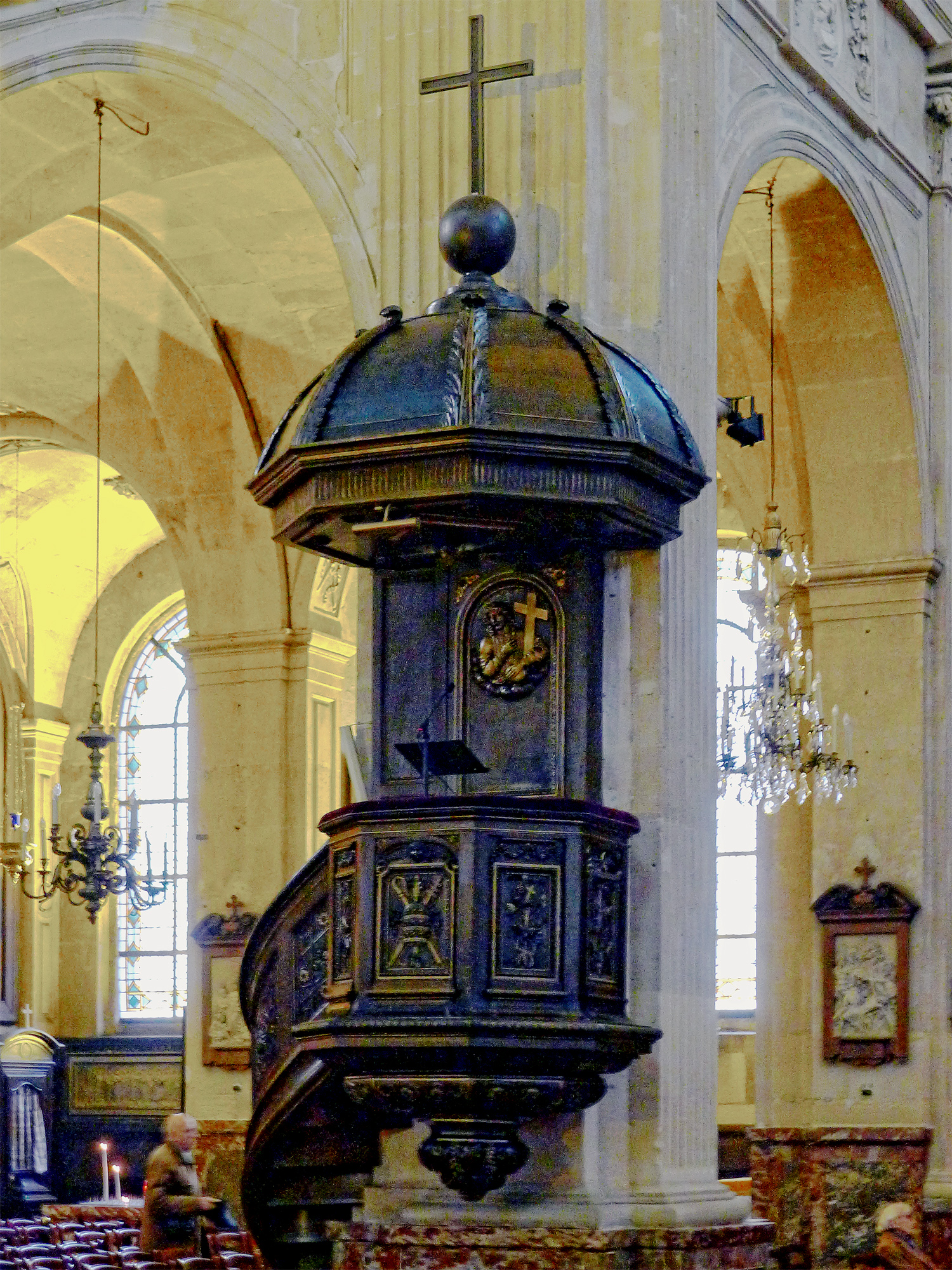
The pulpit in the nave

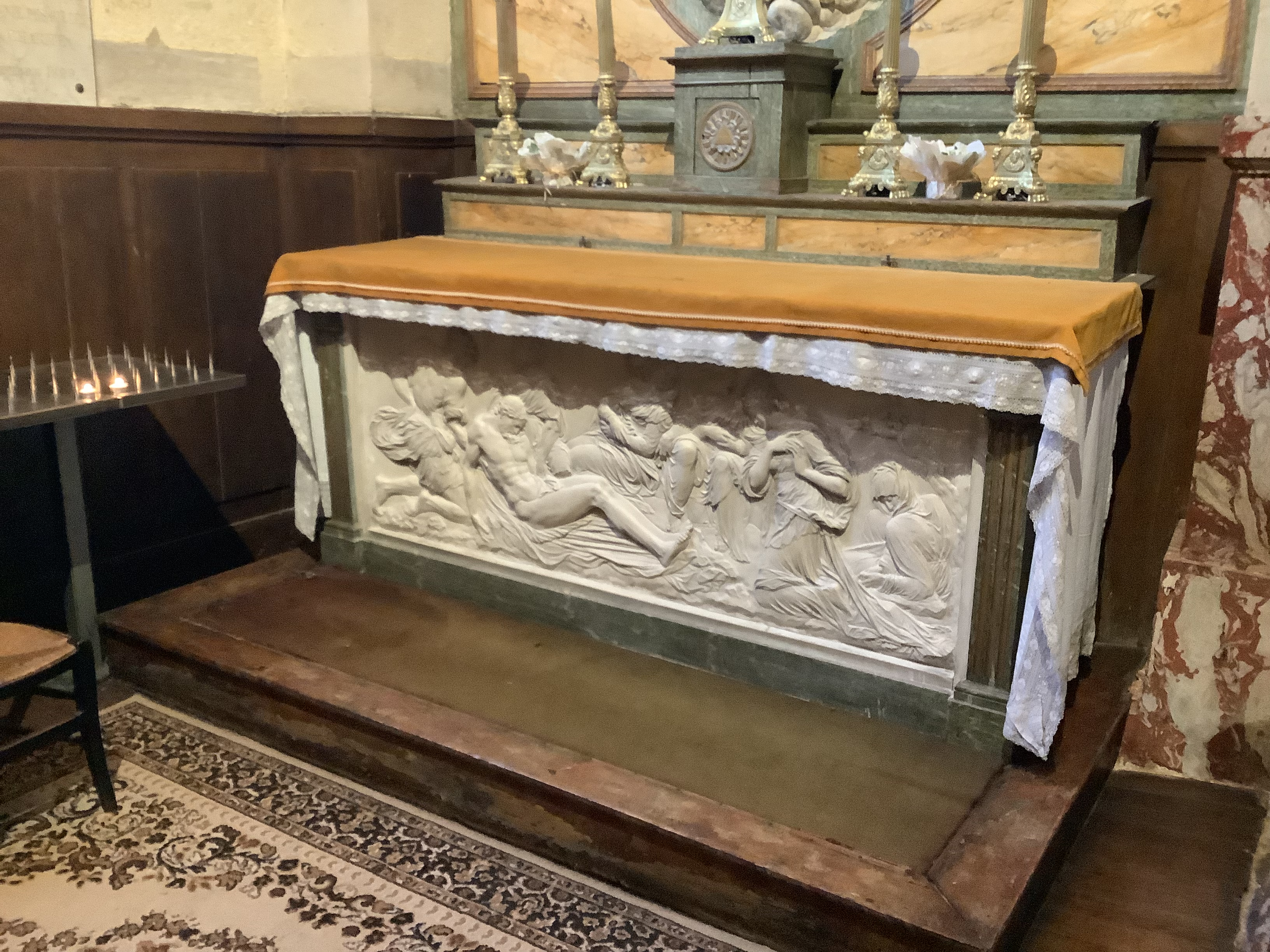
Altar in Chapel of Saint Vincent de Paul

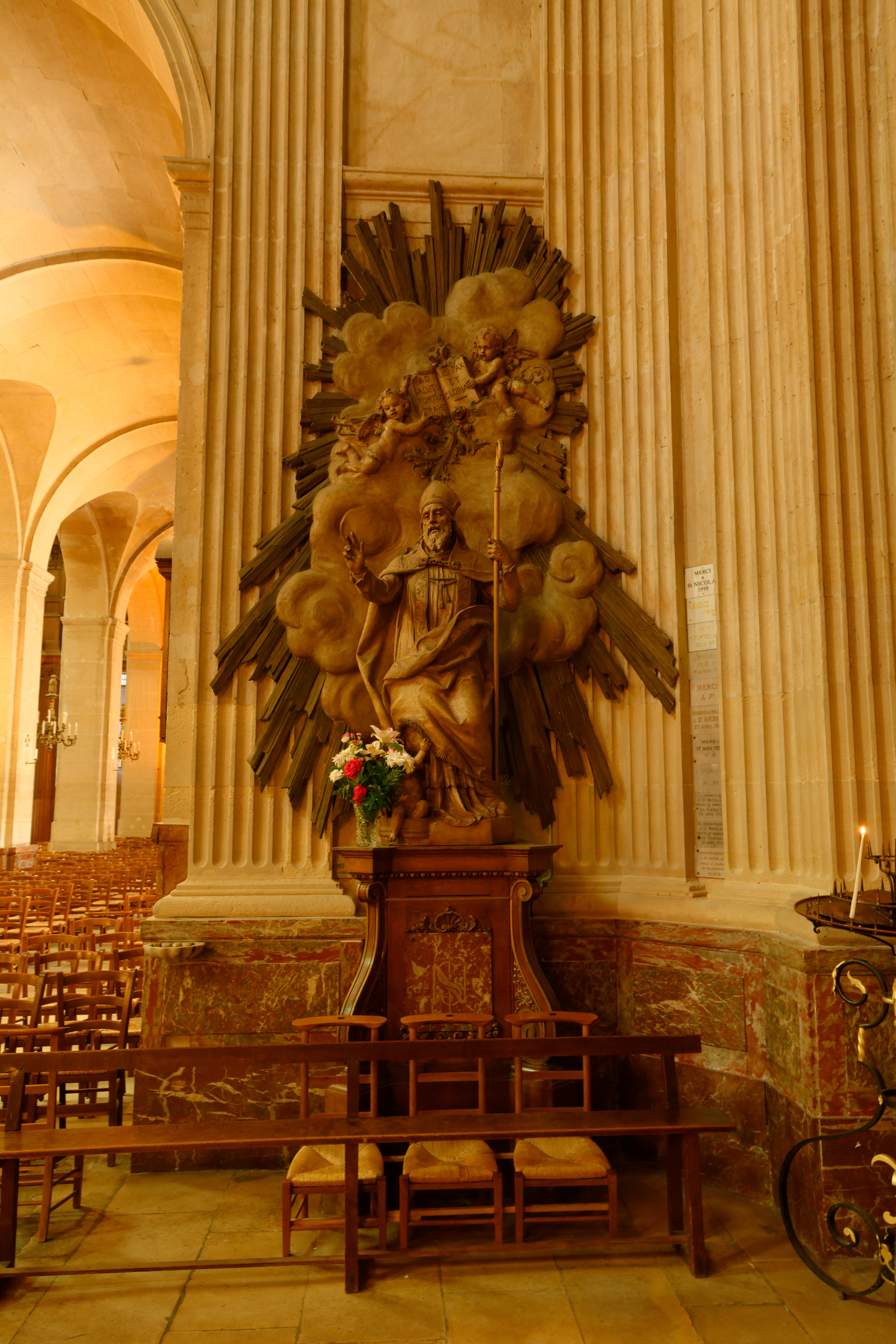
Carved sculpture in the nave

== Services ==
The priests of the SSPX at Saint-Nicolas-du-Chardonnet livestream every Mass offered at the church on YouTube, along with Vespers, clergy-led Rosaries, and catechism lessons.

== Bibliography (in French) ==
- Dumoulin, Aline; Ardisson, Alexandra; Maingard, Jérôme; Antonello, Murielle; Églises de Paris (2010), Éditions Massin, Issy-Les-Moulineaux, ISBN 978-2-7072-0683-1
- Hillairet, Jacques; Connaissance du Vieux Paris; (2017); Éditions Payot-Rivages, Paris; (in French). ISBN 978-2-2289-1911-1
