= Cold Heaven =

Cold Heaven may refer to:

- Cold Heaven (album), a 1997 album by Babylon Whores
- Cold Heaven (novel), a 1983 novel by Brian Moore
- Cold Heaven (film), a 1991 film directed by Nicolas Roeg based on the novel
