= Brian Moore's early fiction =

Brian Moore's early fiction refers to the seven pulp fiction thrillers, published between 1951 and 1957, that the acclaimed novelist Brian Moore wrote before he achieved success and international recognition with Judith Hearne (1955) and The Feast of Lupercal (1957).

Moore, who was born in Belfast in 1921, wrote his first fiction in Canada, where he lived from 1948 to 1958. His earliest books were thrillers, published under his own name or using the pseudonyms Bernard Mara or Michael Bryan. The first two of these pieces of pulp fiction, all of which he later disowned, were published in Canada by Harlequin – Wreath for a Redhead in March 1951 and The Executioners later in 1951.

Arguably the most significant of these early works is Intent to Kill (written by Moore as "Michael Bryan" and published in 1957) which was adapted into a film of the same name, released in 1958. In the film noir genre, it was directed by Jack Cardiff and starred Richard Todd, Betsy Drake and Herbert Lom. In a reappraisal of the novel, Canadian literature historian Brian Busby says: "Care went into its composition. Most writers would take pride in having their name on its cover, but then so very few writers can compare to Moore".

Busby is also complimentary about Moore's final pulp fiction work, Murder in Majorca, for which the working title was Free Ride Home, describing it as "one of the finest thrillers going. He shows off his talent by telling the story from various points of view." Moore returned to the thriller genre years later with his novels The Colour of Blood (1987), Lies of Silence (1990) and The Statement (1995). Busby says "They're the sort of books Graham Greene would have described as 'entertainments'. Murder in Majorca is very much in their league."

== List of works ==
=== As Brian Moore ===
- Wreath for a Redhead (March 1951) Toronto: Harlequin #102 (paperback)
  Published in the United States as Sailor's Leave (1953) New York: Pyramid #94 (paperback)
- The Executioners (1951) Toronto: Harlequin #117 (paperback)
  [No U.S. edition published.] Published in Australia (1956) by Phantom Books #681 (paperback)

=== As Bernard Mara ===
- French for Murder (May 1954) New York: Gold Medal Books #402 (paperback)
- A Bullet for My Lady (March 1955) New York: Gold Medal Books #472 (paperback)
- This Gun for Gloria (March 1956) New York: Gold Medal Books #572 (paperback)

=== As Michael Bryan ===
- Intent to Kill (February 1956) London: Eyre and Spottiswoode (hardback); New York: Dell Publishing #88 (paperback)
- Murder in Majorca (August 1957) New York: Dell Publishing #A145 (paperback)

== Sources ==
- Busby, Brian (2017). The Dusty Bookcase: A Journey Through Canada's Forgotten, Neglected and Suppressed Writing. Windsor, Ontario: Biblioasis. ISBN 978-1-77196-168-4.
