= The Doctor's Wife (Moore novel) =

Novel about a doctor's wife's affair

- First Canadian edition
- Author: Brian Moore
- Genre: novel
- Publisher: Farrar, Straus & Giroux (US); McClelland & Stewart (Canada); Jonathan Cape (UK)
- Publication date: 1976
- Preceded by: The Great Victorian Collection (1975)
- Followed by: The Mangan Inheritance (1979)

The Doctor's Wife is a novel by Northern Irish-Canadian writer Brian Moore, published in 1976 (by Jonathan Cape in the United Kingdom, by Farrar, Straus & Giroux in the United States and by McClelland & Stewart in Canada). Shortlisted for the Booker Prize, it tells the story of Sheila Redden, a doctor's wife from Belfast, who takes an American lover eleven years her junior while in Paris. After a confrontation with her husband, she leaves both him and her new lover, and moves alone to London.

== Reception ==
People magazine observed that in this novel, as in two of his previous works, Judith Hearne and I Am Mary Dunne, Moore writes from "inside the consciousness of a woman... Moore, who has always loved Paris, splendidly evokes shuttered French hotel rooms and boulevard cafes with precise, echoing details. But in telling explicitly of the ardor and the loyalties which rend the doctor’s wife, he will doubtless divide women readers who crave romance from feminists who don’t."

Lynda Bryans, TV presenter and lecturer, commenting in the Belfast Telegraph, said: "The book is beautifully written... It describes passion, pain, love and grief. Moore writes about the feelings of Mrs Redden (the doctor's wife) so well it's hard to imagine the book is written by a man.”

However, Julian Moynahan, reviewing the book for The New York Times, said: "Despite its great technical skill and air of timeliness", The Doctor's Wife "is really quite old‐fashioned in plot management and quite conventional in its implications... When Moore is writing at his serious best, as in 'The Lonely Passion of Judith Hearne' or in 'Catholics,' that small, somber near‐masterpiece, he ranks with the finest novelists of today. 'The Doctor's Wife' is not serious in that sense. it may appear to raise many important questions about passion, family commitments, woman's self‐determination — also about the interconnections of private and public violence and cruelty — yet even in storytelling a parade of appearances must not be confused with the real thing."

According to eNotes, "Moore dramatizes Sheila’s psychological crisis in spiritual terms: She has attained a state of grace during the Villefranche episode, but, according to her Catholic outlook, she must enter purgatory to expiate her venial sins. She chooses an uncertain new life in London, where she can shed her past yet continue her penance for having betrayed both her husband and her lover. Moore, with his sober artistry, has created in Sheila Redden a heroine of a depth, intensity, and subtlety rare in contemporary fiction."

Kirkus Reviews said, however, that in "refusing to go to America with Tom, abandoning her husband and youngster – [Sheila Redden] summarily turns her back on all that was, isolating herself in a smaller void. Moore... specializes in limbos of one kind or another. But somehow the unarticulated decision of this once sensible, now vagrant woman, lacks conviction particularly since all the other externals belong to the glossier knowns of women's fiction--comparable to Mary Dunne's. It's for those other women who stay home to read rather than wander off like the doctor's wife toward a lonelier uncertainty."
