= The Mangan Inheritance =

1979 novel by Brian Moore

- First US edition
- Author: Brian Moore
- Language: English
- Genre: Novel
- Publisher: Farrar, Straus and Giroux (US); Jonathan Cape (UK); McClelland & Stewart (Canada)
- Publication date: 1979
- Publication place: United States
- Pages: 335
- ISBN: 0-374-20194-3
- OCLC: 5007480
- Preceded by: The Doctor's Wife (1976)
- Followed by: The Temptation of Eileen Hughes (1981)

The Mangan Inheritance, published in 1979, is a novel by Northern Irish-Canadian writer Brian Moore. Set in Ireland, it tells the story of a failed poet and cuckolded husband, James Mangan, who discovers a daguerreotype of a bohemian Romantic Irish poet with the same surname and seeks out connections to his literary ancestor.

The blurb on the back of the New York Review Books edition described The Mangan Inheritance as "melodrama at its most inventive and suggestive, an inquiry into the problem of identity and the nature of ancestry that beguiles the reader with dark deeds, wild humor, and weird goings-on, on its way towards a shocking and terrifying—and utterly satisfying—conclusion".

New York magazine described it as a "wonderful union of clarity and inventiveness".

Patricia Craig, in her biography of Brian Moore, says that The Mangan Inheritance is "among other things, a satire on the impulse to track down one's ancestors, on romantic Ireland, and on poetic pretensions".
