= Catholics (novel) =

1972 novel by Brian Moore

- First edition cover
- Author: Brian Moore
- Language: English
- Publisher: McClelland & Stewart (Canada); Jonathan Cape (UK); Holt, Rinehart & Winston (US)
- Publication date: 1972
- Publication place: United Kingdom
- Pages: 102
- ISBN: 0-224-00767-X
- OCLC: 610037
- Preceded by: The Revolution Script (1971)
- Followed by: The Great Victorian Collection (1975)

Catholics is a novel by Northern Irish-Canadian writer Brian Moore. It was first published in 1972. It was republished in 2006 by Loyola Press with an introduction by Robert Ellsberg and a series of study questions.

== Plot ==
Most of the action of the novel takes place on an island monastery off the southwest coast of Ireland. It is set in the future, near the end of the twentieth century and after the Second Vatican Council. The story tells of a young priest sent by the authorities in Rome to fully implement Church reforms in an Irish monastery that still celebrates the Catholic liturgy according to older rites. The young priest, James Kinsella, is initially opposed by the Abbot of the monastery, who tries to preserve his and his monks' way of life. However, the Abbot eventually recognizes the need for—and inevitability of—change.

The novel comes to a head when a confrontation between the Abbot and a senior monk, Matthew, nearly undermines the structure of the monastery. The Abbot is plagued by his own doubts in matters of faith. The novel ends on an ambiguous note as the Abbot prays for the first time in years, but in the face of the abandonment of their traditional way of life.

== Reception ==
Critic Jo O'Donoghue describes Catholics as "in some ways a paradoxical novel". Like Moore, Kinsella is "a sceptic who respects the beliefs of others but also ... a traditionalist in his attitude to the aesthetic and mystery of belief ...[which] will all be lost under the new dispensation". Catholics, says O'Donoghue, "seems to envisage the ordinary Catholic, lay or clerical, merely exchanging a conservative hegemony for a liberal one. Both, ultimately, are equally tyrannical... In this novel, there is lacking that positive sense of the individual bearing witness to his faith... which emerges so strongly from Cold Heaven, from Black Robe and from The Colour of Blood". These three were all written considerably later.

== Film ==
Moore also wrote the screenplay for the 1973 television film version, which stars Trevor Howard, Martin Sheen, and Cyril Cusack.

== Play ==
Moore adapted his novel for the stage. The play premiered in Seattle at the ACT Theatre in May 1980. The University of Washington has a copy of the playscript. Gregory A. Falls directed a cast that included David Frederick White (as "Tomas O'Mallery"), Tony Amendola (as "Brother Kevin"), and John Aylward (as "Father Walter").

== Criticisms ==
The book has drawn criticism within Catholic circles for making the claim that it is possible for Catholic dogma to change, by portraying a fictional "Fourth Vatican Council" that has reversed the Catholic dogma of the real presence of Christ in the Eucharist. This, being in conflict with the dogma of infallibility, has caused the book to be unofficially considered heretical.

In addition to this, several phrases within the book (and the later film) have been claimed to be comparable to rhetoric typical of a Sedevecantist sect, that is in schism with the Catholic Church.
