= The Revolution Script =

1971 fictionalised account by Brian Moore

- First edition
- Author: Brian Moore
- Language: English
- Subject: Quebec's October Crisis in 1970
- Genre: Documentary novel
- Publisher: New York: Holt, Rinehart and Winston; Toronto: McClelland and Stewart; London: Jonathan Cape
- Publication date: 1971 (Canada and USA); 1972 (UK)
- Publication place: Canada
- Pages: 261
- ISBN: 0030867436
- Preceded by: Fergus (1970)
- Followed by: Catholics (1972)

The Revolution Script is a fictionalised account by the novelist Brian Moore of key events in Quebec's October Crisis – the kidnapping by the Quebec Liberation Front of James Cross, the Senior British Trade Commissioner in Montreal, on October 5, 1970 and the murder, a few days later, of Pierre Laporte, Minister of Labour in the Quebec provincial government. It was published in Canada and the United States at the end of 1971. The British newspaper The Sunday Times reproduced excerpts from Moore's book, which was published in the United Kingdom in January 1972.

== Reception and criticism ==
According to Sandra Martin of Toronto's The Globe and Mail, The Revolution Script can be seen as a "Truman Capote-style novel". Ian McGillis, for the Montreal Gazette, described it as "a kind of docu-novel that places the reader in the middle of the October Crisis with an immediacy that makes it feel like this morning’s news".

Kirkus Reviews felt that Moore's attempt to "make the characters less than 'faceless'" fell short but praised his portrayal of the "foolhardy, insurgent enterprise"'s "catalytic tension and instantaneity".

George Woodcock said: "When he is describing settings... he writes vividly and evocatively. When he reconstructs action, he is almost invariably convincing. The coating of verisimilitude, however, begins to wear thin when he tries to create dialogue between the terrorists. The Revolution Script reads then as if it were written, not by Brian Moore the novelist, but by some rather clumsy imitator of Roch Carrier, and the terrorists shape themselves in our minds as incredibly ignorant, naïf and pathetic, which I am sure is not Moore's intention".

Jeanne Flood said that it was "the most flawed and disturbing of all Moore's books" and described its "explicit concern with media" as "nothing less than obsessive". She criticised as "unethical" Moore's "projection of the deeply personal onto public events involving real persons" and argued that the subject matter of the book "demands the scrupulous impersonality of the journalist, not the private emotional energies of the novelist".

However, Moore's biographer, Patricia Craig, described it as "a compact thriller, a perfectly creditable and engrossing reconstruction of a striking sequence of events".

Donald Cameron, reviewing the book in Canadian news magazine Maclean's, said that Brian Moore makes us relive the details of the October crisis "[i]n what must surely be the most brilliant reportage Canada has ever seen... Sometimes the quasi-novel form restricts Moore’s ability to discuss the wider implications of the kidnappings. Yet The Revolution Script is a tour de force, a translation of cops-and-robbers headlines into the political interplay of believable people."

Writing in The Globe and Mail in 2005, more than thirty years after The Revolution Script's publication, Canadian writer Michel Basilières, best known for his 2003 debut novel Black Bird, said: "No book presents the kidnappers, their thoughts and feelings, the milieu, the background, as well as Brian Moore's The Revolution Script (McClelland & Stewart, 1971). This meticulously researched non-fiction novel is the best book ever written in English about October, 1970. Everything is here: the players, the issues, the time and place, the tension endured by an entire city. Moore used his novelist's gifts and his keen eye for tragedy to make sense of something that seemed, to everyone who lived through it, an impossible nightmare."

== Legacy ==
An untitled film script, based on his novel and dated July 1972, is held in Moore's archives at The Harry Ransom Humanities Research Center, at the University of Texas at Austin.

== See also ==
- Politics of Quebec
- October Crisis
- October 1970 (film)
