= George Fetherling =

Canadian poet, novelist, and cultural commentator

Douglas George Fetherling (born 1949) is a Canadian poet, novelist, and cultural commentator. One of the most prolific figures in Canadian letters, he has written or edited more than fifty books, including a dozen volumes of poetry, five book-length fictions, and a memoir. He lives in Vancouver. He has been the weekly literary columnist at five metropolitan newspapers and several national magazines. He has been writer-in-residence at Queen's University, the University of Toronto and the University of New Brunswick. He published under the name Douglas Fetherling until 1999, and thereafter under the name George Fetherling, switching to his middle name to honour his father George after recovering from life-saving surgery for the same medical condition that had killed his father.

He started in the Canadian literary industry in 1966 in Toronto, where he was the first employee of publisher House of Anansi.

A study of Fetherling's books George Fetherling and His Work, edited by Linda Rogers, features essays by W. H. New, George Elliott Clarke, Brian Busby and others.

== Selected bibliography ==
=== Poetry ===
- My Experience in the War – 1970
- Our Man in Utopia – 1971
- Café Terminus – 1973
- Eleven Early Poems – 1973
- Achilles' Navel – 1974
- Subroutines – 1981
- Variorum: New Poems and Old, 1965-1985 – 1985
- Moving Towards the Vertical Horizon – 1986
- Rites of Alienation – 1988
- The Dreams of Ancient Peoples – 1990
- Selected Poems – 1994
- Madagascar – 2000
- Singer, An Elegy – 2004
- The Sylvia Hotel Poems – 2010
- Plans Deranged by Time – 2012

=== Fiction ===
- The File on Arthur Moss – 1994
- Jericho – 2005
- Tales of Two Cities – 2006
- Walt Whitman's Secret - 2010

=== Non-fiction ===
- The Five Lives of Ben Hecht – 1977
- Gold Diggers of 1929 – 1979
- The Blue Notebook: Reports on Canadian Culture – 1985
- The Crowded Darkness – 1988
- The Gold Crusades: A Social History of the Gold Rushes, 1849-1929 – 1988
- The Rise of the Canadian Newspaper – 1990
- A Little Bit of Thunder – 1993
- The Book of Assassins – 2001
- River of Gold: The Fraser and Cariboo Gold Rushes – 2008

=== Biography ===
- The Gentle Anarchist: A Life of George Woodcock – 1998

=== Memoir ===
- Notes from a Journal – 1987
- Travels By Night: A Memoir – 1994
- Way Down Deep in the Belly of the Beast: A Memoir – 1996
- The Writing Life: Journals 1975 - 2005 – 2013

=== Travel writing ===
- Year of the Horse: A Journey through Russia and China – 1991
- The Other China: Journeys around Taiwan – 1995
- Running Away to Sea: Round the World on a Tramp Freighter – 1998
- Three Pagodas Pass: A Roundabout Journey to Burma – 2002
- One Russia, Two Chinas – 2004
- Indochina Now and Then – 2012

=== Anthologies edited ===
- A George Woodcock Reader – 1980
- Carl Sandburg at the Movies: A Poet in the Silent Era 1920-1927 – 1985 (with Dale Fetherling)
- Documents in Canadian Art – 1987
- Documents in Canadian Film – 1988
- The Broadview Book of Canadian Anecdotes – 1988
- Best Canadian Essays 1989 – 1989
- Best Canadian Essays 1990 – 1990
- The Vintage Book of Canadian Memoirs – 2001
