= Black Robe (film) =

1991 film by Bruce Beresford

- Theatrical release poster
- Directed by: Bruce Beresford
- Screenplay by: Brian Moore
- Based on: Black Robe by Brian Moore
- Produced by: Robert Lantos; Sue Milliken; Stéphane Reichel
- Starring: Lothaire Bluteau; Aden Young; Sandrine Holt; August Schellenberg; Tantoo Cardinal
- Cinematography: Peter James
- Edited by: Tim Wellburn
- Music by: Georges Delerue
- Production companies: Alliance Communications; Samson Productions; Hoyts
- Distributed by: Alliance Releasing (Canada); Hoyts-Fox-Columbia TriStar Films (Australia)
- Release dates: 5 September 1991 (Toronto International Film Festival); 4 October 1991 (Canada); 27 February 1992 (Australia)
- Running time: 101 minutes
- Countries: Canada; Australia
- Languages: English; Cree; Mohawk; Algonquin
- Budget: A$11 million
- Box office: $8,211,952

Black Robe is a 1991 historical drama film directed by Bruce Beresford, adapted by Brian Moore from his 1985 novel of the same name. Set in the 17th century, it depicts the adventures of a Jesuit missionary tasked with founding a mission in New France. To do so, he must traverse 2,400 km of harsh wilderness with the help of a group of Algonquins, facing danger from both the unfamiliar environment and rival tribes. The title refers to the nickname given to the Jesuits by the Algonquins, referring to his black cassock.

The film stars Lothaire Bluteau in the title role, with other cast members: Aden Young, Sandrine Holt, Tantoo Cardinal, August Schellenberg, Gordon Tootoosis and Raoul Trujillo. It was the first official co-production between a Canadian film team and an Australian one. It was shot mostly in the Canadian province of Quebec. It was Young and Holt's film debut.

Black Robe premiered at the 1991 Toronto International Film Festival and was given a wide release on 6 October, becoming the highest-grossing Canadian film of 1991. It received generally positive reviews and won several accolades. It was nominated for ten Genie Awards and won six, including Best Motion Picture, Best Director (Beresford), Best Adapted Screenplay (Moore) and Best Supporting Actor (Schellenberg). It was also nominated for ten AACTA Awards, with Peter James winning Best Cinematography.

== Plot ==
Set in New France in 1634 (during the period of conflicts known as the Beaver Wars), the film begins in the settlement that will one day become Quebec City. Jesuit missionaries are trying to encourage the local Algonquin people to embrace Christianity but have thus far had only limited results. Samuel de Champlain, the founder of the settlement, sends Father LaForgue, a young Jesuit priest, to join a Catholic mission in a distant Huron village. With winter approaching, the journey will be difficult and cover as much as 2,400 kilometres.

LaForgue is accompanied on his journey by a non-Jesuit assistant, Daniel, and a group of Algonquin Indians, whom Champlain has charged with guiding him to the Huron village. This group includes Chomina, an older experienced traveller who has clairvoyant dreams; his wife; and Annuka, their daughter. As they journey across the lakes and forests, Daniel and Annuka fall in love to the discomfort of the celibate LaForgue.

The group meets with a band of Montagnais, First Nations people who have never seen Frenchmen before. The Montagnais shaman, Mestigoit, is suspicious (and implicitly jealous) of LaForgue's influence over the Algonquins and accuses LaForgue of being a demon. He encourages Chomina and the other Algonquins to abandon the two Frenchmen and travel instead to a winter hunting lodge. They do so and paddle away from the Frenchmen. LaForgue accepts his fate, but Daniel is determined to stay with Annuka and so follows the Indians as they march across the forest. When one Indian tries to shoot Daniel, Chomina is consumed by guilt at having betrayed Champlain's trust. He and a few other members of the Algonquin tribe return with Daniel to try to find LaForgue.

As they recover LaForgue, a party of Mohawk Iroquois attack them, killing most of the Algonquins, including Chomina's wife, and take the rest captive. The prisoners are taken to an Iroquois fortress, where they are forced to run the gauntlet and to watch Chomina's young son be killed. They are told they will be slowly tortured to death the next day. That night, Annuka seduces their guard and allows him to engage in coitus with her. When that distracts him, she strikes him with a caribou hoof, renders him unconscious, and allows them to escape. Chomina, dying of a wound from his capture, sees a small grove of which he has dreamed many times before, and realizes that it is the place in which he is destined to die. LaForgue tries unsuccessfully to persuade Chomina to embrace Christ before he dies. As Chomina freezes to death in the snow, he sees the She-Manitou appearing to him.

As the weather grows colder, Annuka and Daniel take LaForgue to the outskirts of the Huron settlement but leave him to enter it alone, as Chomina had dreamed must happen. LaForgue finds all but one of the French inhabitants dead since they were murdered by the Hurons, who blamed them for a smallpox epidemic. The leader of the last survivors tells LaForgue that the Hurons are dying and that LaForgue should offer to save them by baptizing them. LaForgue confronts the Hurons.

When their leader asks LaForgue if he loves them, LaForgue thinks of the faces of all of the Indians he has met on his journey and answers "Yes." The leader then asks him to baptize the Hurons, and LaForgue obeys. The film ends with a golden sunrise. An intertitle states that 15 years later, the Hurons, having accepted Christianity, were routed and killed by their enemies the Iroquois; the Jesuit mission to the Hurons was abandoned; and the Jesuits returned to Quebec.

== Cast ==
- Lothaire Bluteau as Father Paul LaForgue
- Aden Young as Daniel Davost
- Sandrine Holt as Annuka
- August Schellenberg as Chomina
- Tantoo Cardinal as Chomina's Wife
- Billy Two Rivers as Ougebmat
- Lawrence Bayne as Neehatin
- Harrison Liu as Awondoie
- Wesley Côté as Oujita
- Frank Wilson as Father Jerome
- François Tassé as Father Bourque
- Jean Brousseau as Samuel de Champlain
- Yvan Labelle as Mestigoit
- Raoul Trujillo as Kiotsaeton
- James Bobbish as Ondesson
- Gordon Tootoosis as Old Aneons
- Denis Lacroix as Taratande
- Marthe Turgeon as LaForgue's mother
- Claude Préfontaine as Old Priest
- Deano Clavet as Mercier
- Linlyn Lue as She-Manitou
- Zoe Hopkins as an Algonquin

== Production ==
Bruce Beresford wanted to make a film based on Brian Moore's novel since it was first published. The rights had been acquired by Canada's Alliance Films, which had signed another director. That person fell out, as did another director, before the job was given to Beresford. Beresford stated:

I think that, even if you have no religious faith whatever or, even if you despised the Jesuits, you would still find it an interesting story. It's a wonderful study of obsession and love. And it is a wonderful adventure of the spirit and of the body. What those people did, going to a country where winters were far more severe than anything they had known in Europe, meeting people who were far more fierce than anyone they had ever encountered... Having to deal with these people shows us something of humanity at its greatest. It's the equivalent of today's people getting into space shuttles and going off into space. It takes unbelievable courage to do this.

The film remained in development hell for over four years due to no major American studio willing to finance the project. Beresford was only able to convince Alliance Films to hire him after his previous film, Driving Miss Daisy, won the Academy Award for Best Picture. The success of Dances with Wolves, a film with similar themes released the prior year, also convinced Alliance of the project's viability.

Funds were raised under a co-production treaty between Canada and Australia. The production needed 30% Australian financing, and the Film Finance Corporation investment had to be spent on Australian elements, such as an Australian crew and two Australian actors.

The film was shot primarily on-location in Quebec, in the Saguenay–Lac-Saint-Jean region. Additional scenes were shot in Rouen in northern France. The entire film was shot in-sequence.

== Release ==
Black Robe opened in Canada on 4 October 1991 and then had a exclusive opening in New York, Los Angeles and Chicago on 1 November 1991 before expanding on 22 November to a further 222 theaters.

== Reception ==
Black Robe was praised as a "magnificently staged combination of top talents delivering a gripping and tragic story", and has been rated one of the most meticulously researched representations of indigenous life put on film. Notably, the film includes dialogue in the Cree, Mohawk and Algonquin languages. The French characters speak English in the film. Latin is used for Catholic prayers.

Political activist Ward Churchill, after highly praising the film-making, criticized historical inaccuracies. He said he thought the film vilified the Mohawks as part of a theme that Indian resistance to European culture was evil.

=== Box office ===
Black Robe grossed $1.1 million in Canada in its first four weeks before opening in the United States. Expanding to 55 screens it grossed $179,467 for the weekend of 3 November 1991. It expanded on the weekend of 22 November to 282 screens, grossing $882,300 for the weekend, finishing 11th in the United States and Canada for the weekend. In Canada, it won the Golden Reel Award, indicating the highest box-office performance of any Canadian film that year. In English Canada, it was among only three Canadian films to gross over $500,000 between 1987 and 1990, along with Jesus of Montreal and Dead Ringers. Black Robe grossed $2,036,056 at the box office in Australia, the third highest-grossing Australian film of the year behind Strictly Ballroom and Romper Stomper.

== Awards and nominations ==
=== Genie Award ===
Year	Category	Nominee	Result
1991	Best Motion Picture	Robert Lantos, Sue Milliken, Stéphane Reichel	Won
1991	Best Achievement in Direction	Bruce Beresford	Won
1991	Best Screenplay, Adapted	Brian Moore	Won
1991	Best Performance by an Actor in a Supporting Role	August Schellenberg	Won
1991	Best Performance by an Actress in a Supporting Role	Sandrine Holt	Nominated
1991	Best Music Score	Georges Delerue	Nominated
1991	Best Achievement in Cinematography	Peter James	Won
1991	Best Achievement in Film Editing	Tim Welburn	Nominated
1991	Best Achievement in Art Direction	Gavin Mitchell, Herbert Pinter	Won
1991	Best Achievement in Costume Design	John Hay, Renée April	Nominated
1992	Golden Reel Award	Robert Lantos, Sue Milliken, Stéphane Reichel	Won

=== AACTA Award ===
Year	Category	Nominee	Result
1992	Best Film	Robert Lantos, Sue Milliken, Stéphane Reichel	Nominated
1992	Best Direction	Bruce Beresford	Nominated
1992	Best Screenplay, Original or Adapted	Brian Moore	Nominated
1992	Best Actor in a Leading Role	Lothaire Bluteau	Nominated
1992	Best Actor in a Supporting Role	August Schellenberg	Nominated
1992	Best Original Music Score	Georges Delerue	Nominated
1992	Best Cinematography	Peter James	Won
1992	Best Editing	Tim Welburn	Nominated
1992	Best Sound	Phil Judd, Penn Robinson, Gary Wilkins	Nominated
1992	Best Costume Design	John Hay, Renée April	Nominated

=== Other awards ===
Year	Association	Category	Nominee	Result
1992	Australian Cinematographers Society	Cinematographer of the Year	Peter James	Won
1992	Motion Picture Sound Editors	Best Sound Editing - Foreign Feature	Phil Judd, Penn Robinson, Karin Whittington, Jeanine Chiavlo, Stephanie Flack, Frank Morrone, Susan Midgley, David Grusovin, Nicki Roller	Won

== See also ==
- Jesuit Missions amongst the Huron
- Innu people
