= James Clarence Mangan =

Irish poet (1803–1849)

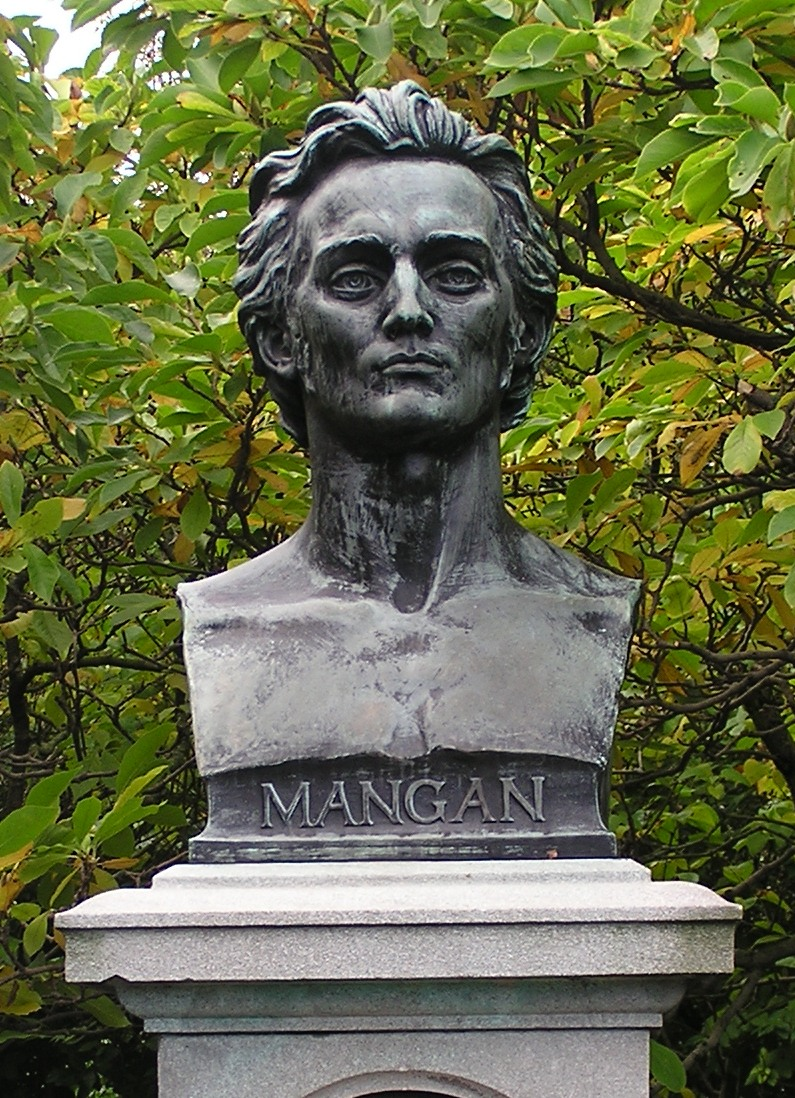
Memorial bust of Mangan in St. Stephen's Green, sculpted by Oliver Sheppard

James Clarence Mangan, born James Mangan (Irish: Séamus Ó Mangáin; 1 May 1803 – 20 June 1849), was an Irish poet. He freely translated works from German, Turkish, Persian, Arabic, and Irish, with his translations of Goethe gaining special interest. Starting around 1840, and with increasing frequency after the Great Famine began, he wrote patriotic poems, such as A Vision of Connaught in the Thirteenth Century. Mangan was troubled, eccentric, and an alcoholic. He died early from cholera, amid the continuing dire conditions of the Famine. After his death, Mangan was hailed as Ireland's first national poet and admired by writers such as James Joyce and William Butler Yeats.

== Early life ==
Mangan was born on 1 May 1803 at Fishamble Street, Dublin, the son of James Mangan, a former hedge school teacher and native of Shanagolden, County Limerick, and Catherine Smith from Kiltale, County Meath. After marrying Smith, James Mangan took over a grocery business in Dublin owned by the Smith family, eventually becoming bankrupt as a result.

Mangan described his father as having "a princely soul but no prudence", and attributed his family's bankruptcy to his father's suspect business speculations and tendency to throw expensive parties. Thanks to poor record keeping, inconsistent biographies, and his own semi-fictional and sensationalized autobiographical accounts, Mangan's early years are the subject of much speculation. However, despite the popular image of Mangan as a long-suffering, poor poet, there is reason to believe that his early years were spent in relative middle-class comfort.

He was educated at a Jesuit school where he learned Latin, Spanish, French, and Italian. He attended three schools before the age of fifteen. Obliged to find a job in order to support his family, for seven years he was a scrivener's clerk and for three years earned meagre wages in an attorney's office, and was later an employee of the Ordnance Survey and an assistant in the library of Trinity College, Dublin.

== Literary career ==
Mangan's first verses were published in 1818. From 1820 he adopted the middle name Clarence. In 1830 he began producing translations – generally free interpretations rather than strict translations – from German, a language he had taught himself. Of interest are his translations of Goethe. From 1834 his contributions began appearing in the Dublin University Magazine. In 1840 he began producing translations from Turkish poetry, Persian poetry, Arabic poetry, and Irish poetry. He was also known for literary hoaxes; some of his "translations" are in fact works of his own, like Twenty Golden Years Ago, attributed to a certain Selber. His connection with The Dublin University Magazine was terminated because his habits rendered him incapable of regular application.

He was friends with the patriotic journalists Thomas Davis, and John Mitchel, who would write his biography. His poems were published in their newspaper The Nation. Mangan was for a time paid a fixed salary, but, as on former occasions, these relations were broken off, though he continued to send verses to "The Nation" even after he had cast in his lot with Mitchel, who in 1848 began to issue The United Irishman.

Although his early poetry was often apolitical, after the Famine he began writing patriotic poems, including influential works such as Dark Rosaleen, a translation of Róisín Dubh and A Vision of Connaught in the Thirteenth Century.

Grave of James Clarence Mangan, Glasnevin, Dublin

His best-known poems include Dark Rosaleen, Siberia, Nameless One, A Vision of Connaught in the Thirteenth Century, The Funerals, To the Ruins of Donegal Castle, Pleasant Prospects for the Land-eaters and Woman of Three Cows. He wrote a brief autobiography, on the advice of his friend Charles Patrick Meehan, which ends mid-sentence. This must have been written in the last months of his life, since he mentions his narrative poem of the Italian Gasparo Bandollo, which was published in the Dublin University Magazine in May 1849.

Mangan was a lonely and often difficult man who suffered from mood swings, depression and irrational fears, and became a heavy drinker and opium user. There are many descriptions of his personal appearance at this time, all of them dwelling on his spare figure, his tight blue cloak, his witch's hat, and his inevitable umbrella. He was described by the artist William Frederick Wakeman as frequently wearing "a huge pair of green spectacles", padded shirts to hide his malnourished figure, and a hat which "resembled those which broomstick-riding witches are usually represented with". In 1849, weakened by poverty, alcoholism and malnutrition, he succumbed to cholera aged only 46. He was buried in Glasnevin Cemetery.

== Style ==
Mangan's poetry fits into a variety of literary traditions. Most obviously, and frequently, his work is read alongside such nationalist political authors as John Mitchel, as they appeared in The Nation, The Vindicator and the United Irishman newspapers; or as a manifestation of the 19th-century Irish Cultural Revival. It is hard not to acknowledge Mangan's debts to such translators and collectors of traditional Irish poetry as Samuel Ferguson and James Hardiman; many of Mangan's poems, for instance Dark Roseleen, appear to be adaptations of earlier translations rather than original translations.

Mangan is also frequently read as a Romantic poet. In particular, he is compared to Samuel Taylor Coleridge and Thomas De Quincey, largely thanks to his rumoured opium addiction and tendency to place his writing within the frame of a vision or dream.

More recently, critics have begun to read Mangan's work as a precursor to modernist and postmodernist experimental writing. His playful literary hoaxes and fake translations (which he called "reverse plagiarism") have been seen as a precursor to the works of Flann O'Brien.

== Reception and legacy ==
During his life and immediately after, Mangan's legacy was co-opted by Irish nationalism, primarily thanks to John Mitchel's biography of Mangan, which stressed that Mangan was "a rebel with his whole heart and soul against the whole British spirit". Naturally, this helped to propel Mangan's legacy as Ireland's first national poet, and to lead later Irish writers to look back at his work.

James Joyce wrote two essays on Mangan, the first in 1902 and the second in 1907 and also used his name in his works, for instance in Araby in Dubliners. Joyce wrote that in Mangan's poetry "images interweave [their] soft, luminous scarves and words ring like brilliant mail, and whether the song is of Ireland or of Istambol it has the same refrain, a prayer that peace may come again to her who has lost peace, the moonwhite pearl of his soul". Joyce also described Mangan as "a prototype for a would-be-nation", but stressed that he was ultimately a "feeble figure" that fell short of such promise.

WB Yeats considered Mangan one of the best Irish poets, along with Thomas Davis and Samuel Ferguson, writing "To the soul of Clarence Mangan was tied the burning ribbon of Genius."

Among the contemporary Irish writers he has influenced are Thomas Kinsella; Michael Smith; James McCabe, who wrote a sensationally discovered continuation of Mangan's autobiography that appeared in the Dublin journal Metre in 2001, but was later revealed – in a Mangan-style hoax – to be written by McCabe rather than Mangan; and David Wheatley, author of a sonnet sequence on Mangan. He is also cited by songwriter Shane MacGowan as an inspiration for both his work and his lifestyle. McGowan's song "The Snake with Eyes of Garnet" features Mangan as a character:

Last night as I lay dreaming
My way across the sea
James Mangan brought me comfort
With laudanum and poitin…

A 1979 novel by Northern Irish/Canadian novelist Brian Moore, The Mangan Inheritance, tells the story of (fictional) young American James Mangan traveling to Ireland to find whether he is descended from the poet.

While Mangan still is not held in the same esteem by critics as Joyce or Yeats, more recent literary criticism has begun to seriously consider his work. Largely, this can be attributed to the publication of David Lloyd's Nationalism and Minor Literature: James Clarence Mangan and the Emergence of Irish Cultural Nationalism in 1987. Lloyd's work was the first to seriously attempt to untangle Mangan the man from the nationalist poet fostered by John Mitchel.

Private papers of Mangan are held in the National Library of Ireland, the Royal Irish Academy, and the archives of Trinity College, Dublin.

== Bibliography ==
- Hourican, Bridget. (2024). Finding Mangan. The many lives and afterlives of James Clarence Mangan, Gill Books, Dublin. 978-0717194834
- Ryder, Seán, ed. (2004). James Clarence Mangan: Selected Writings. University College Dublin Press. ISBN 978-1-900621-92-2.
- Guiney, Louise Imogen, ed. (1897). James Clarence Mangan: His Selected Poems and a Study. Boston: Lamson, Wolffe, & Co.
