= The Feast of Lupercal =

1957 novel by Brian Moore

- First edition (US)
- Author: Brian Moore
- Cover artist: Ivan Chermayeff
- Language: English
- Genre: Psychological fiction
- Publisher: Little Brown
- Publication date: 1957
- Pages: 246
- OCLC: 1184250
- Preceded by: Intent to Kill (as Michael Bryan) (1956)
- Followed by: Murder in Majorca (as Michael Bryan) (1957)

The Feast of Lupercal is a novel by Northern Irish-Canadian writer Brian Moore. It was first published in the United States in 1957, by Boston publisher Little Brown, and in the United Kingdom in 1958 by London publisher André Deutsch. In 1969 a paperback edition was published by Panther Books with the title A Moment of Love.

== Plot ==
Set in Belfast in the 1950s, the novel tells the story of a 37-year-old Catholic male teacher, Diarmuid Devine, who is single and sexually inexperienced. When he overhears a colleague refer to him as “that old woman”, he understands that his life is slipping away from him. He meets and is attracted to a Protestant girl 17 years younger than him, who is on the rebound from an affair with a married man.

== Critical review ==
The poet Patrick Hicks argues that in writing the novel Moore "interrogated the educational system that taught him a version of masculinity that he found unacceptable" and that this enabled him "to become, arguably, one of the first contemporary male novelists with an overtly feminist agenda".

In Brian Moore: A Critical Study, Jo O'Donoghue claims that "Moore is nowhere more anti-clerical than in The Feast of Lupercal... If the novel appears to exaggerate the ugly side of Catholic education it is because Moore retains a great deal of bitterness towards the system of religious education to which he himself was subjected. The novel is an unmitigated condemnation of the kind of Catholicism that denies the freedom of the individual."

== See also ==
- Lupercalia
