= Federation of BC Writers =

The Federation of BC Writers is the largest writers organization in British Columbia, Canada. Its stated goals are to foster the art and profession of writing in British Columbia; to generate a sense of community among British Columbia writers; to provide support for writers at all stages of their careers; and to raise public awareness of the writers of British Columbia, their work, and their contribution to regional and Canadian cultures.

Among the organization's past presidents are David Watmough, D.C. Reid, Linda Rogers, George Fetherling, Brian Busby, Sylvia Taylor, Hendrik Slegtenhorst, Craig Spence, Candice James, George Opacic, Ben Nuttall-Smith and Coco Aders-Weremczuk.

== See also ==
- List of writers from British Columbia
