= John Wilson Foster =

Irish literary critic and cultural historian

John Wilson Foster FRSC (born 1942) is an Irish literary critic and cultural historian.

== Early life and career ==
John Wilson (Jack) Foster was born and grew up in Belfast, Northern Ireland, the son of William Foster (draughtsman) and Gertrude Foster (née Scott) who both came from working-class east Belfast. He was educated at Annadale Grammar School, a post-Butler Education Act (Northern Ireland) 1947 school. He won a scholarship to Queen's University Belfast where he graduated B.A. (1963) in English, philosophy and social anthropology, and M.A. (1965) in English and philosophy. His graduate teachers and mentors were the philosopher W.B. Gallie and the critic and poet Philip Hobsbaum who had been taught by F.R. Leavis and William Empson.

On a Fulbright Travelling Scholarship he was accepted into the PhD program of the University of Oregon, USA (Department of English) and received his doctorate in 1970 with a dissertation on the Irish fiction writers Brian Moore, Michael McLaverty and Benedict Kiely. He returned to Ireland and before being appointed in 1974 to the Department of English, University of British Columbia (UBC), Canada, he lived in Belfast then Dublin and expanded his dissertation to become his first book, Forces and Themes in Ulster Fiction (Rowman & Littlefield; Gill & Macmillan, 1974), the first charting of Northern Irish fiction.

== Criticism ==
His second book, Fictions of the Irish Literary Revival: A Changeling Art (Gill & Macmillan; Syracuse University Press), a critical survey of the prose fiction of the Revival, theretofore neglected, and a new reading of the Revival itself, was not published until 1987 though in the meantime Foster published numerous articles and chapters on eighteenth-century poetry, folklore theory, and Irish literature. That book, along with Colonial Consequences: Essays in Irish Literature and Culture (Lilliput Press, 1991) and numerous articles, identified him as a prominent participant in the lively and contentious literary-critical debates waging in Ireland at the same time as the political conflict known as "the Troubles". He was associated in his participation with the literary critic Edna Longley.

Foster discovered the poetry of Seamus Heaney around 1970 and published an early article on it in Critical Quarterly in 1974. Twenty years later that was followed by an engaged survey of the work in The Achievement of Seamus Heaney (Lilliput Press, 1995).

Although a critic of the political colouration of the cultural activities of the Field Day Theatre Company, of which Heaney was a director, Foster became a friend of Heaney's and was invited by Seamus Deane (general editor) to be a contributing editor of the influential 3-volume Field Day Anthology of Irish Writing (1991). Much of his criticism has been on Irish fiction, culminating in Irish Novels 1890–1940: New Bearings in Culture and Fiction (Oxford University Press, 2008). This was an attempt to re-orientate critical readings of that crucial period in Irish culture through its overlooked popular fiction by Oscar Wilde and Bram Stoker among others, but chiefly by neglected Irish women fiction writers whose work refutes the hoary "no Irish fiction tradition" thesis.

== Cultural history ==
As in the cases of other literary critics of the time, Foster's criticism diversified to include cultural history. Wanting during the so-called "culture wars" to expand the received notion of Irish culture, he attempted to retrieve the culture that produced and lay behind the impressive engineering achievements of his native city, including the building of Titanic and other great liners, and the role those achievements and the industrialised city of Belfast played in late Victorian and Edwardian modernity. The Titanic Complex (Belcouver Press), appeared in 1997, Titanic (Penguin Books) in 1999 and The Age of Titanic (Merlin Publishing) in 2002.

Wishing to perform a comparable cultural rehabilitation task in Ireland for its superb natural history, Foster (an amateur naturalist) conceived and co-edited Nature in Ireland: A Scientific and Cultural History (Lilliput Press, 1997), a volume with 28 contributing writers and researchers and published on both sides of the Atlantic. The lectures Foster gave as the inaugural National University of Ireland Visiting Professor (Maynooth, 2001) were published as Recoveries: Neglected Episodes in Irish Cultural History 1860–1914 (University College Dublin Press, 2002) and included the evolution debate in Belfast, pioneering field naturalism in Ireland, and Belfast's cutting-edge applied science culture.

== Later career ==
Foster has taught or researched at the University of Toronto, the University of Ulster, and the National University of Ireland, Galway. He was a Leverhulme Visiting Professor to the United Kingdom in 2004–05. Taking early retirement from UBC and returning to Belfast from Vancouver in 2008 as Professor Emeritus, Foster became an honorary research professor the following year at his alma mater, Queen's University Belfast. He was elected to the Royal Society of Canada in 2010.

In 2012 he was commissioned to write a dramatic monologue for the centenary commemoration of the loss of RMS Titanic and he wrote A Better Boy, spoken by Lord Pirrie, the neglected genius behind Titanic and other great liners built by Harland and Wolff of Belfast. The play was first produced in Belfast by Kabosh Theatre Company with the Ulster actor Lalor Roddy in the role of Pirrie. With the distinguished actor Ian McElhinney from Game of Thrones playing Pirrie, A Better Boy has been performed in Bangor, County Down, Belfast, Brussels and Paris.

In 2014, Notting Hill Editions published Pilgrims of the Air, a literary meditation on the American passenger pigeon (Ectopistes migratorius), the most populous recorded species of bird that collapsed in numbers in the 1890s and became extinct in the wild around 1900. Lightly revised and subtitled "The Passing of the Passenger Pigeons", the book was published by New York Review Books in 2017. As an amateur birder, Foster has birdwatched in the United States of America, Canada, Australia, New Zealand, Japan, Europe, United Kingdom and Ireland. Foster was commissioned by the Alice C. Tyler Perpetual Trust (Seattle) to write the biography of both the Tyler Prize for Environmental Achievement and the couple who founded and funded the Prize, John C. Tyler and Alice C. Tyler; the book, The Space-Blue Chalcedony: Earth's Crises and the Tyler Bounty (2020), comprises a brief history of ecology from the 1920s until the current "climate change wars".

== Works ==
- Forces and Themes in Ulster Fiction (1974)
- Fictions of the Irish Literary Revival: A Changeling Art (1987)
- Colonial Consequences: Essays in Irish Literature and Culture (1991)
- The Poet's Place: Ulster Literature and Society (ed. with Gerald Dawe) (1991)
- "Irish Fiction 1965–1990", The Field Day Anthology of Irish Writing (gen. ed. Seamus Deane) (1991)
- The Achievement of Seamus Heaney (1995)
- The Idea of the Union: Statements and Critiques (ed.1995)
- The Titanic Complex: A Cultural Manifest (1997)
- Nature in Ireland: A Scientific and Cultural History (ed. with Helena C.G. Chesney) (1997)
- Titanic (ed. 1999). As The Titanic Reader (USA 2000)
- The Age of Titanic: Cross-Currents in Anglo-American Culture (2002)
- Recoveries: Neglected Episodes in Irish Cultural History 1860–1914 (2002)
- The Nabob: A Tale of Ninety-Eight by Andrew James (ed. with Notes and Afterword) (2006)
- The Cambridge Companion to the Irish Novel (ed. 2006)
- "The Irish Renaissance, 1890–1940: Prose in English," Cambridge History of Irish Literature (eds. Margaret Kelleher and Philip O'Leary) (2006)
- Irish Novels 1890–1940: New Bearings in Culture and Fiction (2008)
- Between Shadows: Modern Irish Writing and Culture (2009)
- A Better Boy: A Titanic Monologue (2012)
- Pilgrims of the Air: The Passing of the Passenger Pigeons (2014, 2017)
- Titanic: Culture and Calamity (2016)
- The Space-Blue Chalcedony: Earth's Crises and the Tyler Bounty (2020)
- Midnight Again: The Wartime Letters of Helen Ramsey Turtle (2021)
- The Idea of the Union: Great Britain and Northern Ireland - Realities and Challenges (ed. with William Beattie Smith) (2021)
- Ireland Out of England and Other Inconveniences (2024)

== Reviews ==
- Murphy, Hayden (1976), review of Forces and Themes in Irish Fiction, in Burnett, Ray (ed.), Calgacus 3, Spring 1976, p. 54, ISSN 0307-2029

== Resources ==
Foster's biography appears in Modern Irish Lives: Dictionary of 20^{th-}Century Biography (1996), ed. Louis McRedmond, Contemporary Authors (Thomson Gale, 2007) and Canadian Who's Who (Grey House, 2011). Also, The John Wilson Foster archive is at Emory University Library, Atlanta, Georgia.
