= Torn Curtain =

1966 film by Alfred Hitchcock

- Theatrical release poster by Howard Terpning
- Directed by: Alfred Hitchcock
- Written by: Brian Moore (Note: Uncredited contributions by Keith Waterhouse and Willis Hall.)
- Produced by: Alfred Hitchcock
- Starring: Paul Newman; Julie Andrews
- Cinematography: John F. Warren
- Edited by: Bud Hoffman
- Music by: John Addison
- Production company: Universal Pictures
- Distributed by: Universal Pictures
- Release date: July 14, 1966 (US)
- Running time: 128 minutes
- Country: United States
- Languages: English; German
- Budget: $3 million
- Box office: $13 million

Torn Curtain is a 1966 American political thriller spy film directed and produced by Alfred Hitchcock, starring Paul Newman and Julie Andrews, and featuring Lila Kedrova, Hansjörg Felmy, Tamara Toumanova, Ludwig Donath, Wolfgang Kieling, and David Opatoshu in supporting roles. Written by Brian Moore, the Cold War narrative concerns an American scientist (Newman) who appears to defect behind the Iron Curtain to East Germany.

The film premiered in the United States on July 14, 1966, and was released by Universal Pictures. In comparison to Hitchcock's previous films, Torn Curtain received comparatively lukewarm reviews, but was a commercial success.

== Plot ==
Dr. Michael Armstrong, an American physicist and rocket scientist, is travelling to a conference in Copenhagen with his assistant and fiancée, Sarah Sherman. Armstrong receives a radiogram to pick up a book in Copenhagen; it contains a message which says, "Contact π in case of emergency." He tells Sherman he is going to Stockholm, but she discovers he is flying to East Berlin and follows him. When they land, he is welcomed by representatives of the East German government. Sherman realizes that Armstrong has defected and is appalled that, given the circumstances of the Cold War, if she stays with him, she will likely never see her home or family again.

Armstrong visits a contact, a "farmer", where it is revealed that his defection is in fact a ruse to gain the confidence of the East German scientific establishment in order to learn how much their chief scientist Gustav Lindt and, by extension, the Soviet Union know about anti-missile systems.

Armstrong has made preparations to return to the West via an escape network known as π. However, he is followed to the farm by his appointed chaperone, Hermann Gromek, an East German Stasi officer. Gromek realizes what π is and that Armstrong is a double agent, and as Gromek is calling the police, a tortuous struggle commences that ends with Gromek being killed by Armstrong and the farmer's wife. Gromek and his motorcycle are buried on the land. The taxicab driver who drove Armstrong to the farm, however, had also seen Gromek arrive. When he sees Gromek reported missing in the newspaper, he contacts the police.

Visiting the physics faculty of Karl Marx University in Leipzig the next day, Armstrong's interview with the scientists ends abruptly when he is questioned by security officials about the missing Gromek. The faculty try to interrogate Sherman about her knowledge of the American "Gamma Five" anti-missile program, but she refuses to cooperate and runs from the room, even though she has agreed to defect to East Germany. Armstrong catches up with her to confide his actual motives and asks her to go along with the ruse.

Armstrong finally goads Professor Lindt into revealing his anti-missile equations in a pique over what Lindt believes are Armstrong's mathematical mistakes. When Lindt hears over the university's loudspeaker system that Armstrong and Sherman are being sought for questioning, he realizes that he has given up his secrets while learning nothing in return. Armstrong and Sherman escape from the school with the help of the university clinic physician Dr. Koska.

Pursued by the Stasi, the couple travel to East Berlin, led by Mr. Jacobi in a decoy bus operated by the π network. Roadblocks, highway robbery by Soviet Army deserters, and bunching with the "real" bus result in the police becoming aware of the deception, and everyone aboard is forced to flee. While they are looking for the Friedrichstraße post office, the two encounter the exiled Polish countess Kuczynska, who leads them there in hopes of being sponsored for a U.S. visa. When they are spotted, Kuczynska trips the pursuing guard, allowing Armstrong and Sherman to escape to their next destination.

Two men approach them on the pavement, one of whom is the "farmer". He gives them tickets to the ballet as part of a plan to smuggle them to Sweden that evening inside the ballet troupe's luggage. Attending the ballet featuring Tchaikovsky's Francesca da Rimini and waiting to be picked up, they are spotted and reported to the police by the lead ballerina, who flew to East Berlin on the same airplane as Armstrong.

Armstrong and Sherman escape through the crowd after shouting "fire". An aide hides them in two hampers of costumes, and they are ferried across the Baltic Sea to Sweden on an East German freighter. The ballerina, who is also on board, sees the aide speak to two hampers as they are lifted onto the pier. She informs the guards and the hampers are shot with a machine gun. It is then revealed that Armstrong and Sherman were in two different hampers. The aide had noticed the ballerina's suspicions and had intentionally spoken to the wrong hampers, so that the three could swim to shore during the commotion. They safely arrive in Sweden.

== Cast ==
- Paul Newman as Michael Armstrong
- Julie Andrews as Sarah Sherman
- Lila Kedrova as Countess Kuczynska
- Hansjörg Felmy as Heinrich Gerhard
- Tamara Toumanova as the Prima Ballerina
- Wolfgang Kieling as Hermann Gromek
- Ludwig Donath as Prof. Gustav Lindt
- Günter Strack as Prof. Karl Manfred
- David Opatoshu as Herr Jacobi
- Gisela Fischer as Dr. Koska
- Mort Mills as the Farmer
- Carolyn Conwell as the Farmer's wife
- Arthur Gould-Porter as Freddy, the bookseller
- Britt Semand as Magda
- Gloria Gorvin as Fräulein Mann
- Harold Dyrenforth as Otto Haupt
- Norbert Schiller as Prof. Guttman
- Robert Boon as Prof. Winkelmann
- Peter Bourne as Prof. Olaf Hengström
- Andrea Darvi as Gretel Koska
- Eugene Weingand as Cab Driver
- Curt Lowens as VOPO Officer
- Jan Malmsjö as Swedish Photographer
- Winfried and Norbert Grupe as Blonde Twins

Alfred Hitchcock's cameo is a signature occurrence in most of his films. In Torn Curtain, he can be seen (eight minutes into the film) sitting in the lobby of the Hotel d'Angleterre holding a baby. The music playing at this point is an adaptation of Funeral March of a Marionette by Charles Gounod, the theme for Alfred Hitchcock Presents.

== Production ==
=== Background ===
By the time Torn Curtain, his fiftieth film, was conceived, Hitchcock was the most famous film director in Hollywood, having already reached the pinnacle of commercial success six years before with Psycho (1960). Audiences eagerly anticipated his next film. To find a gripping plot, Hitchcock turned toward the spy thriller genre, which was greatly in fashion since the early 1960s with the success of the James Bond series starting in 1962 with Dr. No. Hitchcock had already found success in that genre many times, most recently in 1959 with North by Northwest.

The idea behind Torn Curtain came from the defection of British diplomats Guy Burgess and Donald Maclean to the Soviet Union in 1951. Hitchcock was particularly intrigued by Maclean's life in the Soviet Union and his wife, Melinda Marling, who followed her husband behind the Iron Curtain a year later with their three children. With these facts as a starting point, Hitchcock created a plot line involving an American nuclear physicist, Professor Michael Armstrong, defecting to East Germany. Against his will, the physicist is followed to East Berlin by his fiancée and assistant, who decides to remain loyal to him regardless of his intentions. The twist of the story is that Professor Armstrong is in fact a member of a secret spy ring, and he has defected only with the goal of stealing a formula from an East German scientist.

=== Writing ===
In autumn 1964, Hitchcock offered to let Vladimir Nabokov, the author of Lolita, who had successfully helped adapt his own novel to a well-regarded film directed by Stanley Kubrick in 1962, write the script. Although intrigued, Nabokov declined the project, feeling that he knew very little about political thrillers.

As the original focus of the plot was on the female lead, the spy's girlfriend, the script was commissioned early in 1965 to Irish-Canadian writer Brian Moore, who was known for successfully tackling female characters. His well-regarded first novel, Judith Hearne, centers on an alcoholic Belfast spinster. In addition to this, Moore had adapted his own novel The Luck of Ginger Coffey into a film the previous year. Moore moved to Hollywood to work on the script. His five-page synopsis, completed on 26 March 1965, already contained two key scenes of the film: Torn Curtain's opening aboard a cruise steamer in the Norwegian fjords and the brutal killing of undercover agent Gromek by the American scientist and a farm woman. Moore's final draft, completed by 21st June, pleased neither Hitchcock nor Universal. It lacked the humor and sparkle characteristic of a Hitchcock film. On his part, Moore complained that Hitchcock had "no concept of character" and that he had "a profound ignorance of human motivation". Brian Moore's own dissatisfaction with the project was reflected in his novel Fergus (1970), which features Bernard Boweri, an unsympathetic character based on Hitchcock.

To polish the dialogue and improve the script, Hitchcock hired British authors Keith Waterhouse and Willis Hall, known for their screenplays for Whistle Down the Wind (1961), A Kind of Loving (1962), and Billy Liar (1963), the latter based on the novel by Waterhouse. They rewrote some dialogue on a day-to-day basis as the film was shot. However, their contribution was restricted by the director's resistance to change and concern for detail. His notes to them were along the lines of the following: "Scene 88. We should eliminate the floor concierge. My information is that they do not have these in East Berlin; Scene 127 C. I would like to discuss the place where the sausage is carved; On Scene 139, where we had someone describing the Julie Andrews character as beautiful... do you think beautiful is perhaps too much, and cannot we say lovely instead?"

Submitted to arbitration, the Writers Guild gave sole script credits to Moore.

=== Casting ===
Universal Pictures executives insisted on famous stars being cast as the leads. Paul Newman and Julie Andrews were imposed on Hitchcock by studio president Lew Wasserman rather than being his personal choices. The director felt that the stars were ill-suited to their roles, while their salaries of $750,000 took a big part of the film's $5 million budget.

At the time, Julie Andrews was Hollywood's biggest star after the back-to-back successes of her films Mary Poppins (1964) and The Sound of Music (1965). As she was much in demand, Andrews was available for only a short period of time, and that meant the production of the film was rushed, although Hitchcock was not yet satisfied with the script.

For supporting actors, Hitchcock cast Lila Kedrova, who won an Academy Award for Zorba the Greek, as Countess Kuczynska; Tamara Toumanova as the prima ballerina; Ludwig Donath as Professor Lindt; and Wolfgang Kieling as Hermann Gromek.

=== Filming ===
Hitchcock initially wanted to shoot the film entirely on location in the Eastern Bloc but could not because he refused to give East German officials a copy of his screenplay. Moore later said that Hitchcock probably could have secured filming permits in East Germany, Czechoslovakia, and Poland if he had tried harder.

Principal photography of the film began on 18 October 1965 on Stage 18 at the Universal back lot in Los Angeles. Hein Heckroth was the film's production designer. The shooting schedule lasted three months, including a two-week hiatus while Paul Newman recuperated from a chin infection. Most of the film was shot on sets, with the various East German locales filled out by matte paintings and backdrops created by Albert Whitlock. A second unit captured exterior location shots in East Berlin, under the pretext of shooting a travel documentary. Some additional location shooting took place in Frankfurt, West Germany. A scene set at Karl Marx University was filmed at the University of Southern California. Filming was completed in mid-February 1966.

Hitchcock sought a more grounded, naturalistic look for the film in comparison to the saturated color palettes of his previous films shot by Robert Burks. In lieu of Burks, who was unavailable, the director hired John F. Warren as his cinematographer. Warren had previously shot 81 episodes of Alfred Hitchcock Presents, and worked in the camera departments of his earlier films Rebecca and Spellbound.

Although unexcited about his leading actress, Hitchcock was always very polite with Julie Andrews. About her experience making the film, Andrews commented: "I did not have to act in Torn Curtain. I merely went along for the ride. I don't feel that the part demanded much of me, other than to look glamorous, which Mr Hitchcock can always arrange better than anyone. I did have reservations about this film, but I wasn't agonized by it. The kick of it was working for Hitchcock. That's what I did it for, and that's what I got out of it."

The working relationship between Hitchcock and Newman was problematic. Newman came from a different generation of actors, not from the likes of Cary Grant and James Stewart. He questioned Hitchcock about the script and the characterization throughout filming. Hitchcock later said he found Newman's manner and approach unacceptable and disrespectful. Newman insisted that he meant no disrespect toward Hitchcock and once said, "I think Hitch and I could have really hit it off, but the script kept getting in the way." When Newman, a Method actor, consulted Hitchcock about his character's motivations, the director replied: "Motivation is your salary." Furthermore, as Hitchcock discovered, the expected onscreen chemistry between Newman and Andrews failed to materialize.

Unsatisfied with the lead actors, Hitchcock shifted the plot's point of view from the defecting scientist's wife to the American amateur spy, and he focused his attention on the colorful international actors in the supporting roles. Lila Kedrova was Hitchcock's favorite among the cast; he ate lunch with her several times during filming and invited her home for dinners with his wife. Although the length of the film was shortened in post-production, Hitchcock left Countess Kuczynska's scenes intact in the final cut.

The film's climax in a theater was filmed on Sound Stage 28 at Universal Studios, where the 1925 version of The Phantom of the Opera with Lon Chaney, Sr. was filmed 41 years earlier, as well as the 1943 version. The set was demolished in 2014.

Perhaps the best known scene is the fight to the death between Armstrong and Gromek, a gruesome, prolonged struggle. In conversation with François Truffaut, Hitchcock said that he included the scene to show the audience how difficult it can be to kill a man because a number of spy thrillers at the time made killing look effortless.

Steven Spielberg told James Lipton on Inside the Actors Studio that as a young man he sneaked onto the soundstage to observe the filming and remained for 45 minutes before an assistant producer asked him to leave.

The production occurred during the 1965 Watts race riots, leaving Kieling disgusted with American society. As a result, after the film was released, he defected to East Germany in real life, calling the United States "the most dangerous enemy of humanity in the world today" and guilty of "crimes against the Negro and the people of Vietnam."

== Music ==
Two scores were written for the film. The first was written by Hitchcock's frequent collaborator Bernard Herrmann. Hitchcock and Universal asked Herrmann for a pop and jazz-influenced soundtrack and even hoped Herrmann might write a song for lead actress Julie Andrews to perform. However, the score Herrmann provided was not what Hitchcock and the studio wanted, and his revisions failed to satisfy them. Hitchcock and Herrmann ended their long-time collaboration, and John Addison was approached to write a new score.

Although the Addison score was issued commercially in 1966 (and has been re-released), the Herrmann score has been re-recorded and reissued several times, eclipsing Addison's in terms of available versions. Recordings of Herrmann's original studio sessions exist and have circulated online. Elmer Bernstein made the first commercial recording of the score with the Royal Philharmonic Orchestra on Warner Bros. Records in 1978. Esa-Pekka Salonen recorded a suite from the film as part of a Herrmann album with the Los Angeles Philharmonic Orchestra in 1996. Joel McNeely subsequently recorded an expanded version with the National Philharmonic Orchestra for Varese Sarabande Records in 2010.

In the restaurant scene, The Emperor Waltz (Kaiser-Walzer, Op. 437) (1889) by Johann Strauss II is played in the background.

In the climactic scene involving the ballet at the East Berlin theatre, the music was excerpted from Tchaikovsky's Francesca da Rimini.

== Release ==
Torn Curtain held its world premiere in Boston on July 14, 1966. It opened in New York City on July 27, and in Los Angeles on August 3.

=== Home media ===
The film was released on Blu-ray by Universal Pictures in October 2013, and on 4K Blu-ray in October 2023.

== Reception ==
The film made $7 million in the United States box office. It ranked 8th on Cahiers du Cinéma's Top 10 Films of the Year List.

However, after its premiere, the film was not as well received by critics. Bosley Crowther of The New York Times called the film "a pathetically undistinguished spy picture, and the obvious reason is that the script is a collection of what Mr. Hitchcock most eschews—clichés." Penelope Houston, writing for Sight & Sound, commented: "What went wrong here, one suspects, was something basic in the story line." The reviewer in Variety said: "Some good plot ideas are marred by routine dialogue, and a too relaxed pace contributed to a dull overlength," adding "Hitchcock freshens up his bag of tricks in a good potpourri which becomes a bit stale through a noticeable lack of zip and pacing." "Awful," "preposterous," and "irritating slack," concluded Renata Adler in The New Yorker. The Monthly Film Bulletin wrote, "Up until about the point at which the plot makes itself clear, Torn Curtain is as good as anything Hitchcock has ever done in his other forty-nine (or is it fifty-one?) films ... The let-down comes with the verdant studio hillock that was surely never meant to fool anyone, and after this the film drops like a stone, without impetus, without imagination, without interest."

Richard Schickel, writing in Life, concluded: "Hitchcock is tired to the point where what once seemed highly personal style is now repetitions of past triumphs."

Writing in Punch, Richard Mallet asserted: "The film as a whole may be a bit diffuse... but it has some brilliant scenes, it's pleasing to the eye, and it is continuously entertaining." Richard L. Coe of The Washington Post also liked the film, writing that "Hitchcock has given us several sequences that will prove memorable." He singled out Countess Kuzynska's search for a sponsor for her escape to the United States as a sequence that stood as "a short story in itself. It could be shown independently of the rest of the film, a gripping vignette with a beginning, a middle and an end."

Torn Curtain holds a 63% rating on review aggregator Rotten Tomatoes based on 32 reviews, with an average rating of 6.40/10.

== See also ==
- List of American films of 1966

== Sources ==
- Busby, Brian. Character Parts: Who's Really Who in CanLit. Knopf, Toronto, 2003. ISBN 0-676-97578-X.
- Dassanowsky, Robert. "'Ceci n'est pas une Allemagne': On the Treachery of Images and the Deconstruction of Hitchcock’s Thriller in Torn Curtain." Hitchcock and the Cold War: New Essays on the Espionage Films, 1956-1969. Ed. Walter Raubicheck. Pace University Press, New York. 2018. ISBN 978-1935625308
- Maxford, Howard. The A - Z of Hitchcock: The Ultimate Reference Guide, B.T Batsford, London, 2002. ISBN 0-7134-8738-0
- McGilligan, Patrick. Alfred Hitchcock: A Life in Darkness and Light. Regan Books, New York, 2003. ISBN 0-06-039322-X
- Perry, George. The Complete Phantom of the Opera. New York: Henry Holt and Company, 1987. ISBN 0-8050-1722-4.
