= Fergus (novel) =

1970 novel by Brian Moore

- First edition (US)
- Author: Brian Moore
- Genre: Novel
- Publisher: Holt, Rinehart and Winston
- Publication date: 1970
- Publication place: United States
- Media type: Print
- ISBN: 9780030853197
- Preceded by: I Am Mary Dunne (1968)
- Followed by: The Revolution Script (1971)

Fergus, a novel by Northern Irish-Canadian writer Brian Moore, was published in 1970, in the United States by Holt, Rinehart and Winston. It tells the story of Fergus Fadden, a 39-year-old Irish-born writer living in California, who is haunted by ghosts from his past, including that of his father.

Moore's biographer, Patricia Craig, described it as "wholly original, and singularly diverting". Jo O'Donoghue says that, in Fergus, "Moore carries the theme of family influence to an extreme conclusion". George Woodcock, reviewing the novel for the quarterly journal Canadian Literature, said: "Fergus's nightmare is never less than convincing. The novel that bears his name is a masterpiece of the best kind of fantasy".
