= Heather Standring =

British illustrator (1928–2018)

Heather Evelyn Standring (1928–2018) was a British illustrator.

== Life and career ==
Standring was born in Olveston, Gloucestershire in 1928. She trained at London's Central School of Arts and Crafts.

She designed book dust jackets for Brian Moore's Judith Hearne, and Kay Dick's Solitaire. And for Wolf Mankowitz's Laugh Till You Cry, Donald Windham's The Warm Country and Ernest Frost's The Visitants.

Standring taught illustration part-time for many years at Maidstone College of Art.

Standring married Patrick M. Smythe in London in 1960. She died in Herefordshire in 2018.
