= No Other Life =

1993 book by Brian Moore

- First US edition
- Author: Brian Moore
- Language: English
- Publisher: Doubleday (US); Bloomsbury (UK); Knopf Canada (Canada)
- ISBN: 978-0-385-41514-9
- Preceded by: Lies of Silence (1990)
- Followed by: The Statement (1995)

No Other Life is a novel by Northern Irish-Canadian writer Brian Moore, published in 1993.

The novel is set in the future, on the fictional Caribbean island of Ganae (based loosely on Haiti). The story is told by Father Paul Michel, a Canadian missionary to Ganae, as a letter to himself about the life he has led. Father Paul supports a young priest, Jeannot, in his rebellion against Ganae's despotic ruler Uncle D.

== Reception ==
Reviewing the novel for The Independent, its critic Tom Adair said: "No Other Life dovetails questions of allegiance, tests of faith and the clash of cultures into a fiction of ideas tied at its heart to real lives lived. It is Moore's best work by far since Black Robe; at times it bites like a truly great novel. If pleasure indeed corrupts the soul, then this very novel is a 24 carat sin."

Henry Louis Gates Jr. in The New York Times described it as "a brilliant meditation on spiritual indeterminacy, on the struggle between religious and temporal faith – on the question of how (or even whether) religious belief should be expressed in the political realm".

Publishers Weekly described Moore's novel as "a work as compelling as his Booker-shortlisted Lies of Silence...This is the best writing Moore has done in many years, and certainly bears comparison with that other 20th-century classic about Haiti, Graham Greene's The Comedians."

Writing in The Independent in 2009, Stephen Smith, in a re-evaluation of the novel, explains that Moore, influenced by Graham Greene, "took a lead from the story of Jean-Bertrand Aristide [President of Haiti 1991 - 1996 and 2001- 2004] and his real-life progress from rags to spiritual riches" and shows how the life of Moore's protagonist predicts Aristide's eventual political fate. "Moore's literary prescience, comparable to Greene's prefiguring the Cuban missile crisis in Our Man in Havana, has to the best of my knowledge never been remarked on".
