= Sue Milliken =

Australian film producer and author

Sue Milliken AO
- Born: Susan Kathleen Milliken
- Occupations: Film and television producer, author
- Organization: Australian Film Commission (chair 1994–1997)
- Awards: Genie Award (1991) for Black Robe; Raymond Longford Award (1993; Chauvel Award (2008); Canadian Screen Award
- Website: suemilliken.com

Susan Kathleen Milliken AO is an Australian film and television producer, screenwriter and author. She is probably best known for Black Robe in which she won the Genie Award for Best Picture in 1991, apart from working in Australia, she produced 60 episodes of the US sci-fi series Farscape.

Milliken started work in the film industry in the 1960s with the Australian Broadcasting Corporation, in the continuity department, before becoming a freelance production manager, working on such shows as Skippy the Bush Kangaroo, she made a number of films with director and screenwriter Bruce Beresford, including The Odd Angry Shot and Ladies in Black She was the chairwomen of the Australian Film Commission (now Screen Australia) from 1994 to 1997.

Milliken was made an Officer of the Order of Australia (AO) in the 2008 Australia Day Honours for "service to the film and television industry through a range of organisations, as an advocate for the development of the industry, for support and encouragement of Indigenous film makers, and as a producer". In 1993, she was awarded the Raymond Longford Award and 2018, Milliken won the Chauvel Award, which acknowledges significant contribution to the Australian screen industry. She has won Canadian Screen Award and Genie Award.

== Works ==
=== Films ===
- The Odd Angry Shot (1979) – producer
- The Fringe Dwellers (1985) – producer
- Les Patterson Saves the World (1987) – producer
- Black Robe (1991) – producer
- Sirens (1994) – producer
- Dating the Enemy (1995) – producer
- Paradise Road (1997) – producer
- Crocodile Dreaming (2007) – producer
- My Brother Jack (2001)
- The Redfern Story (2013) – producer
- Ladies in Black (2018) — producer and co-screenwriter

=== Books ===
- Selective Memory; Melbourne, Vic. : Hybrid Publishers, 2013. ISBN 9781921665875
- There’s a Fax From Bruce; Strawberry Hills, NSW : Currency Press Pty Ltd, 2016. ISBN 9781925005660
