= The Colour of Blood =

1987 political thriller by Brian Moore

- First UK edition
- Author: Brian Moore
- Language: English
- Genre: political thriller
- Publisher: Jonathan Cape (UK); McClelland & Stewart (Canada); Dutton (US)
- Publication date: 1987
- Publication place: United Kingdom
- Media type: Print
- Pages: 182
- ISBN: 978-0-224-02513-3
- OCLC: 18192603
- Preceded by: Black Robe (1985)
- Followed by: Lies of Silence (1990)

The Colour of Blood, published in 1987, is a political thriller by Northern Irish-Canadian novelist Brian Moore about Stephen Bem, a Cardinal in an unnamed East European country who is in conflict with the Roman Catholic Church hierarchy and finds himself caught in the middle of an escalating revolution.

== Description ==
Clancy Sigal, writing in The New York Times, described the novel as a study of faith under pressure: "Almost in thriller form, it is also a wise and illuminating meditation on the labyrinthine forces at work in a Roman Catholic Communist country like Poland (where Mr. Moore served with a United Nations relief group after the war)."

According to critic Jo O'Donoghue, The Colour of Blood deals with the problem of how the modern Catholic Church "is to live in tandem with the secular authority".

In her biography of Moore, Patricia Craig describes The Colour of Blood as a protest against intolerance, "with fanatical Catholicism presented as a destructive force. At the same time the Cardinal himself stands for another kind of Catholicism: moderate and incorruptible, and not unaccommodating of theological uncertainties".

== Awards ==
It won the Sunday Express Book of the Year award in 1987 and was also nominated for the Booker Prize.
