= Intent to Kill (1958 film) =

British film noir thriller by Jack Cardiff

- Directed by: Jack Cardiff
- Written by: Jimmy Sangster; Brian Moore (novel)
- Produced by: Adrian D. Worker
- Starring: Richard Todd; Betsy Drake; Herbert Lom
- Cinematography: Desmond Dickinson
- Music by: Kenneth Jones
- Distributed by: Twentieth-Century Fox
- Release dates: 16 July 1958 (UK); 31 March 1959 (U.S.)
- Running time: 88 minutes
- Country: United Kingdom
- Language: English

Intent to Kill is a 1958 British film noir thriller directed by Jack Cardiff and starring Richard Todd, Betsy Drake and Herbert Lom. The film was based on the 1957 novel of the same name by Brian Moore (as Michael Bryan). It was shot on location in Montreal, Quebec, Canada, with an international cast of European and North American actors.

== Plot ==
Having survived an assassination attempt, Juan Menda, president of an unspecified South American country, is moved to Montreal under a false name for treatment of a potentially fatal cranial blood clot. His political opponents have got wind of his whereabouts and hire a trio of Canadian hitmen to finish the job. Menda's aide Francisco is also in town, and unknown to Menda he is actually a prime-mover in the assassination plot, keeping close to Menda while duplicitously passing on information to the would-be killers. Not only is Francisco an unsuspected political arch-rival, but he is also keeping an eye on Menda's glamorous wife Carla, with whom he fancies his chances once Menda is out of the way.

Meanwhile, British surgeon Bob McLaurin is under pressure from his nagging, dissatisfied wife Margaret, who wants him to give up his job in Canada and move back to London to open a private cosmetic surgery for the wealthy, where he could at least double his income. Margaret claims to know of an (imaginary) affair of Bob with fellow surgeon Nancy Ferguson, and is threatening to go public with the information. The worry causes Bob to lose concentration during Menda's operation, and he almost makes a fatal slip-up. However, in the end the operation is a complete success.

As Menda recovers, he grows uneasy about Carla's apparent lack of interest as she makes no effort to visit. He also starts to suspect that there is more to Francisco than meets the eye. Eventually he comes to the conclusion that the two of them are in league in some way, at best to dally romantically behind his back, at worst to be working with his enemies to plot his demise. Fearing for his safety, he demands to be moved to a different hospital room.

The hitmen make their move on what they believe to be Menda's room, only to find they have killed a completely innocent man who is in the hospital for surgery on a slipped disc. Bob, Nancy and the police all believe the unfortunate dead man was mistaken for Menda, and a policeman is detailed to provide Menda with a 24-hour guard until he is ready to return home. The hitmen, determined not to lose their payoff, end up acting rashly and their carelessness leads to a confrontation in the hospital corridors, shooting it out with the police while Bob is caught up in the middle. The hitmen start to turn on each other. The wounded Bob tackles one, and during a struggle the two crash out of a window and fall to the ground. The unconscious assassin is arrested.

As confusion and chaos rage in the hospital, one of the hitmen manages to slip away and takes the opportunity to enter Menda's temporarily unguarded room to perform a quick hit. He discovers that Menda is far more ready for him than he could have anticipated.

== Cast ==
- Richard Todd as Dr Bob McLaurin
- Betsy Drake as Dr Nancy Ferguson
- Herbert Lom as Juan Menda
- Warren Stevens as Finch
- Paul Carpenter as O'Brien
- Alexander Knox as Dr McNeil
- Lisa Gastoni as Carla Menda
- Carlo Giustini as Francisco Flores
- Peter Arne as Kral
- Catherine Boyle (Katie Boyle) as Margaret McLaurin
- John Crawford as Boyd
- Jackie Collins as Carol Freeman
- Kay Callard as Carol's friend

== Production ==
Richard Todd claims he was forced to make the film under his contract with Fox. He called it "a stinker. It was a melodramatic, unbelievable thriller" which "had all the merits of a run-of-the-mill TV drama." He says it was shot over eight weeks at Elstree, saying it was "a totally forgettable picture, and I don't think I ever saw the finished product. I can't even recall the story."

== Critical reception ==
The Monthly Film Bulletin wrote: "'The most distinguished of British lighting camermen, here turned director, provides a lively and inventive action thriller, whose best and tensest moments adequately compensate for any improbabilities in the plot. The operation scene, incidentally, might be slightly too harrowing for the squeamish."

The Radio Times Guide to Films gave the film 2/5 stars, writing: "Cinematographer Jack Cardiff turned director with this B-thriller, set in Montreal. Critics at the time wondered why he bothered." Leslie Halliwell said: "Solidly entertaining suspenser."

In British Sound Films: The Studio Years 1928–1959 David Quinlan rated the film as "good", writing: "Fast-moving, tense thriller, with unexpected developments."

== See also ==
- Brian Moore's early fiction
