= The Temptation of Eileen Hughes =

1981 novel by Brian Moore

- First US edition
- Author: Brian Moore
- Genre: novel
- Publisher: Farrar, Straus & Giroux (US); McClelland & Stewart (Canada); Jonathan Cape (UK)
- Publication date: 1981
- Pages: 211
- Preceded by: The Mangan Inheritance (1979)
- Followed by: Cold Heaven (1983)

The Temptation of Eileen Hughes, published in 1981, is a novel by Northern Irish-Canadian writer Brian Moore. It portrays a quiet young shop assistant from Northern Ireland and her relationship with her rich employers Bernard and Mona McAuley who take her on a trip to London.

Joyce Carol Oates in The New York Times, while appreciating the qualities of Moore's earlier novels, was critical of this one for being "so sketchy, anemic and hurried that one is led to wonder what has gone amiss. For not only is character largely unexplored here – and humor absent – but Mr. Moore tells his story in so perfunctory a manner that it is as if he is merely going through the motions of a narrative this time."

== Television adaptation ==
A TV film based on the novel was made by the BBC and broadcast in the United Kingdom on 3 April 1988. Directed by Tristram Powell, it starred Angharad Rees, Ethna Roddy and Mary Duddy.
