= The Sunday Express Book of the Year =

The Sunday Express Book of the Year also known as The Sunday Express Fiction Award was awarded between 1987 and 1993. Worth £20,000 for the winner and £1,000 for each of the five shortlisted authors, it was the most lucrative fiction prize in Britain at the time.

== Winners ==
- 1987 – Brian Moore, The Colour of Blood
- 1988 – David Lodge, Nice Work
- 1989 – Rose Tremain, Restoration
- 1990 – J. M. Coetzee, Age of Iron
- 1991 – Michael Frayn, A Landing on the Sun
- 1992 – Hilary Mantel, A Place of Greater Safety
- 1993 – William Boyd, The Blue Afternoon
