= Denis Sampson =

Irish writer and literary critic

Denis Sampson is an Irish writer and literary critic who was born in Whitegate, County Clare in Ireland in 1948 and now lives in Montreal, Canada. In 2015 he wrote a memoir, A Migrant Life, about his rural Irish childhood and his passion for books. He is review editor for the Canadian Journal of Irish Studies and an English teacher at Vanier College, Montreal.

His published works include studies of the works of John McGahern and of Brian Moore.

Sampson has a bachelor's degree and a master's degree in English language and literature from University College, Dublin and a PhD in English language and literature from McGill University, Montreal.

He is a cousin of Irish novelist Edna O'Brien.

== Works ==
- The Found Voice: Writers' Beginnings (2016), 192pp. Oxford University Press, ISBN 9780198752998
- A Migrant Heart (2014), 238pp. Montreal: Linda Leith Publishing
- Young John McGahern: Becoming a Novelist (2012), 196pp. Oxford University Press, ISBN 9780199641772
- Brian Moore: The Chameleon Novelist (1998), 344pp. Dublin: Marino Books
- Outstaring Nature's Eye: The Fiction of John McGahern (1993), 263pp. Washington, D.C.: The Catholic University of America Press, ISBN 978-0813207667
