= Catholics (ITV Sunday Night Theatre) =

- ITV Sunday Night Theatre episode
- Episode no.: Series 6 Episode 9
- Directed by: Jack Gold
- Written by: Brian Moore
- Based on: Catholics by Brian Moore
- Cinematography by: Gerry Fisher
- Editing by: Anne V. Coates
- Original air date: 1973

"Catholics" is a 1973 television play also known as Conflict, A Fable of the Future and The Visitor, which was directed by Jack Gold.

Based on the novel of the same name by Brian Moore, who also wrote the screenplay for the film, it stars Trevor Howard, Martin Sheen and Cyril Cusack and was originally presented on the ITV Sunday Night Theatre.

The film is rated 4.5 out 5 stars in DVD & Video Guide 2007.

== Plot ==
Brian Moore's original novel was written in 1972. The film is set in the then futuristic year of 2000.

In defiance of the Sacrosanctum Concilium from the edicts of the Second Vatican Council, and a future Fourth Vatican Council, a group of monks from a monastery located on an island offshore the Republic of Ireland conducts the traditional Tridentine Mass in Latin on the Irish mainland. These traditional masses are so popular that groups from all parts of the world make pilgrimages to attend the masses and express their displeasure at the changes in the Roman Catholic Church. This future Vatican Council also destroys the mystery of the Mass, denies Transubstantiation, and insists that priests only wear clerical clothing on ceremonial occasions.

The Vatican is outraged at the beginnings of a potential Counter-Reformation, particularly when an upcoming interfaith dialogue is about to take place in Singapore. The Father General sends out Father Kinsella, a strong adherent of Liberation theology to order the monks to change their ways or face transfer to other monasteries.

== Cast ==
- Martin Sheen as Father Kinsella
- Trevor Howard as The Abbot
- Raf Vallone as Father General (role deleted in some prints)
- Cyril Cusack as Father Manus
- Andrew Keir as Father Matthew
- Godfrey Quigley as Father Walter
- Michael Gambon as Brother Kevin
- Leon Vitali as Brother Donald
- Cecil Sheridan as Brother Malachy
- Tom Jordan as Father Terrence
- Seamus Healy as Brother Pius
- John Kelly as Brother Paul
- John Franklyn as Brother Martin
- Patrick Long as Brother Sean
- Liam Burk as Brother Daniel
- Richard Oliver as Brother Alphonsus

== Production ==
The film was shot on Sherkin Island, County Cork, with many interiors shot in Cahir Castle, County Tipperary. It was produced by HTV for ITV.
