= The Great Victorian Collection =

1975 novel by Brian Moore

- First UK edition
- Author: Brian Moore
- Genre: Fantasy
- Publisher: Jonathan Cape (UK); Farrar, Straus & Giroux (US); McClelland and Stewart (Canada)
- Publication date: 2 June 1975 (US)
- Preceded by: Catholics (1972)
- Followed by: The Doctor's Wife (1976)

The Great Victorian Collection, published in 1975, is a fantasy novel by Northern Irish-Canadian writer Brian Moore.It tells the story of a man who dreams that the empty parking lot he can see from his hotel window has been transformed by the arrival of a collection of priceless Victoriana on display in a vast open-air market. When he awakes he finds that he can no longer distinguish the dream from reality.

It won the 1975 James Tait Black Memorial Prize for Fiction and the Governor General's Award for English-language fiction.

== Plot ==
Anthony Maloney, an assistant professor of history and an expert in Victorian artifacts checks into a motel in Carmel, California. He dreams that the parking lot outside his motel has been transformed into an open air market for all things Victorian. He wakes to find that his dream is reality. He goes to the market to examine the valuable artifacts, only to find that the genuine artifacts become fakes when he removes them form the market.

== Reception ==
The book won the 1975 James Tait Black Memorial Prize for Fiction and, in Canada in 1975, the Governor General's Award for English-language fiction.

The American science fiction author and poet Thomas M. Disch included The Great Victorian Collection in his list of "modern classic" fantasy novels. David Pringle included it as Number 56 in his 1988 book Modern Fantasy: The Hundred Best Novels. Pringle called it "an elegant, ironic, and touching parable."
