= Cold Heaven (film) =

1991 film by Nicolas Roeg

- Theatrical release poster
- Directed by: Nicolas Roeg
- Screenplay by: Allan Scott
- Based on: Cold Heaven by Brian Moore
- Produced by: Jonathan D. Krane
- Starring: Theresa Russell; James Russo; Mark Harmon
- Cinematography: Francis Kenny
- Edited by: Tony Lawson
- Music by: Stanley Myers
- Distributed by: Hemdale Film Corporation
- Release dates: January 10, 1992 (Palm Springs Film Festival); May 29, 1992 (U.S.); November 18, 1992 (London Film Festival)
- Running time: 105 minutes
- Countries: Mexico; United States
- Language: English
- Budget: $4.5 million
- Box office: $99,219

Cold Heaven is a 1991 supernatural thriller film directed by Nicolas Roeg, and starring Theresa Russell, James Russo, Mark Harmon, Julie Carmen, and Seymour Cassel. Adapted by Allan Scott from the 1983 novel of the same name by Brian Moore, the film follows a lapsed Catholic woman whose husband inexplicably rises from the dead, profoundly challenging her beliefs. The film score was by Stanley Myers. It’s an international co-production film between Mexico and the United States.

Cold Heaven had its world premiere at the 1992 Palm Springs International Film Festival before receiving a limited theatrical release in the United States on May 24, 1992. It received mostly unfavorable reviews from film critics.

== Plot ==
Marie Davenport, a lapsed Catholic, is having an affair with Dr. Daniel Corvin, unbeknownst to her husband, Dr. Alex Davenport. She intends to break the news of the affair to Alex while attending a medical conference with him in Mexico. However, before she can speak to him, Alex is struck by a passing motorboat while swimming in a bay at Acapulco. He is rushed to the hospital with a massive head laceration and dies during emergency surgery.

The following morning, the hospital notifies Marie that Alex's body has inexplicably disappeared from the morgue prior to his scheduled autopsy. Upon returning to her Acapulco hotel room, Marie discovers that Alex's possessions have also mysteriously vanished. Meanwhile, Daniel ends his relationship with his partner, Anna, intending to leave her for Marie, which leaves Anna infuriated. Marie returns alone to her home in Los Angeles. Shortly after, she retrieves a phone message—which she presumes is from Daniel—asking her to travel to the same hotel in Carmel-by-the-Sea where she first met Daniel. She also discovers an imprint on a telephone notepad showing the exact same hotel address, deepening her confusion over whether Alex might still be alive.

After visiting the local convent, Marie returns to her hotel room and is shocked to find Alex there. Alex reveals his recollection of the accident and his waking up in the hospital morgue. Exhausted, Alex falls asleep and appears to stop breathing, only to wake up again later. Deeply shaken, Marie visits the local church and speaks with Monsignor Cassidy, recounting how she abandoned her faith after her mother died when Marie was a teenager. She also confesses that a year earlier, while walking along the ocean cliffs near the convent, she experienced a vision of the Virgin Mary emerging from two ponds below, instructing her to tell a priest that a sanctuary must be rebuilt.

Daniel arrives in Carmel-by-the-Sea and meets Marie at the hotel, where she tells him that Alex is alive. Marie reluctantly tells Daniel she cannot be with him, as she still feels a profound connection to Alex. Though defeated, Daniel performs a brief medical examination of Alex, who ignores him while holding Marie's hand. The gravely ill Alex is admitted to a ward in a San Francisco hospital. Around the side of his bed, Daniel discusses his condition with other clinicians. Father Niles, a younger colleague of Monsignor Cassidy, follows Marie to San Francisco in an effort to discuss her vision, though she initially rebuffs him. When Marie visits Alex in the hospital, he suffers a violent seizure and vomits blood. Marie is comforted by Father Niles, who has trailed her to the hospital and gently cleans the blood from her face. Moved by his compassion, Marie confides in Father Niles, confessing her affair with Daniel and admitting she had been trying to tell Alex that their marriage was failing and that Daniel wanted her to leave him; wracked with guilt, she interprets Alex's survival as a supernatural sign and a second chance.

After Alex is discharged, he and Marie stay at a hotel, where he awakens in the night thrashing violently as his head wound inexplicably begins bleeding again. Panicked, Marie phones Father Niles for help and flees back to the convent in Carmel-by-the-Sea. On the cliffs where Marie had her vision, a young nun, Sister Martha, prays calmly alongside her as a sudden wind sweeps across the rocks and a cross appears embedded in the cliffside, terrifying Marie. Meanwhile, Alex wakes alone in the hotel, his head wound miraculously healed. Father Niles then speaks gently with Marie on the cliffs, helping her let go of her guilt and suggesting that the sanctuary she was told to rebuild may be her own marriage.

Marie returns to the hotel, where Daniel arrives moments later in pursuit of her. Inside the room, Marie reunites and embraces with Alex as a defeated Daniel departs, while Father Niles watches the sunset from the cliffs.

== Cast ==
- Theresa Russell as Marie Davenport
- Mark Harmon as Dr. Alex Davenport
- James Russo as Daniel Corvin
- Julie Carmen as Anna Corvin
- Seymour Cassel as Tom Farrelly
- Richard Bradford as Monsignor Cassidy
- Diana Douglas as Mother St. Agnes
- Talia Shire as Sister Martha
- Will Patton as Father Niles
- Cástulo Guerra as Dr. DeMencos
- James Ishida as Dr. Tanaki
- Jeanette Miller as Sister Katarina
- Lenny Von Dohlen as Hotel Clerk (uncredited)

== Production ==
=== Development ===
Cold Heaven was adapted by Allan Scott from Brian Moore's 1983 novel of the same name.

=== Filming ===
Principal photography of Cold Heaven began in September 1989 in La Jolla, California as well as in Mexico.

== Release ==
Cold Heaven premiered at the Palm Springs International Film Festival on January 10, 1992. It was released theatrically in Los Angeles and New York City on May 29, 1992. It subsequently screened at the London Film Festival on November 18, 1992.

=== Home media ===
Hemdale Home Video released the film on VHS in 1992. Scorpion Releasing released a limited edition Blu-ray of the film on August 19, 2020.

== Reception ==
=== Box office ===
Cold Heaven was a box-office bomb, grossing $99,219 domestically

=== Critical response ===
Time Out gave the film a mixed review, noting that "Roeg's adaptation of Brian Moore's novel fuses deeply felt emotions and religious ideas into a gripping metaphysical thriller that is both moving and intellectually challenging," but conceded "for all its technical brilliance and narrative assurance, the film's climactic scenes require an act of faith that no film-maker—Christian, agnostic or atheist—has any right to ask". Janet Maslin of The New York Times similarly felt the film's first act was promising, but ultimately deemed Roeg's direction "peculiarly blunt and uncomplicated, except on those occasions when he can edit groups of turbulent images—memories of the accident, a thunderstorm, swaying rosaries, crashing religious icons—into some semblance of even greater turmoil. Most of the time the film looks and sounds drab, thanks particularly to hand-held-camera work and to the bland motel-room interiors in which much of the story unfolds. The ending is especially weak, as the film builds toward a visionary episode that winds up looking absurd." Marc Savlov of The Austin Chronicle found the film's screenplay and style inconsistent, writing that "Roeg seems to be trying to mix bargain basement theology with his usual mystery-suspense motif and in the end it all falls apart... As always, Roeg’s work is stylish and surefooted—this time out, though it heads nowhere fast."

Kathleen Carroll of the New York Daily News awarded the film two out of five stars, noting that Roeg "effectively illustrates Marie's muddled emotional state, but his movie version of Brian Moore's novel is less than gripping." Neil Sinyard in Reference Guide to British and Irish Film Directors described it as "disappointing... unusually dour and dry in its treatment of guilt and paranoia". Peter Rainer of the Los Angeles Times wrote that the film is "ponderous without having much weight; we keep expecting the story to fill out, to achieve a vision that matches Marie’s. But the big storm-tossed finale comes across like cut-rate De Mille. This is a “religious” movie without much religious feeling. Roeg manages to work up a queasy atmosphere of impending dread in the boating scenes and the scenes between Marie and another priest (Will Patton) who keys into her visions." The Austin American-Statesman's Michael MacCambridge felt Russell's performance was underwhelming, and that, "in the end, the pieces don't fit together. Roeg has always been self-indulgent, but a picture as uneven as this one causes us to wonder how he became a respected director in the first place."

Variety praised the film, "Infidelity has seldom offered as broad a canvas for torment and religious guilt as in Nicolas Roeg's Cold Heaven, a tortured study of love on the rocks that comes off like a jumbled bad dream," adding that "Russell, under husband Roeg’s direction, does terrific work in her scene with a priest (Will Patton), but she and Harmon have a tough and thankless task in playing out this tormenting psychodrama." The Chicago Reader's Jonathan Rosenbaum gave the film a favorable review, deeming it a "must-see" and writing: "I doubt that I could give an accurate plot summary of Cold Heaven even if I wanted to. That’s the film’s charm: for much of its running time, it unveils itself by other means. People who assume that life is only a story or that emotions in movies are only about events are missing one hell of a lot when it comes to both life and movies."

== Sources ==
- Salwolke, Scott (1993). Nicolas Roeg, Film by Film. Jefferson, North Carolina: McFarland & Company. ISBN 978-0-899-50881-8.
