= Lies of Silence =

Book by Brian Moore

- First edition cover
- Author: Brian Moore
- Language: English
- Subjects: The Troubles
- Genre: Suspense, literary novel
- Publisher: Nan A. Talese
- Publication date: August 1, 1990
- Publication place: Ireland/United Kingdom
- Pages: 197
- ISBN: 978-0-385-41514-9
- Preceded by: The Colour of Blood (1989)
- Followed by: No Other Life (1993)

Lies of Silence is a novel by Brian Moore published in 1990. It focuses on the personal effects of The Troubles, a period of ethnic, religious and political conflict in Northern Ireland from the late 1960s to 1998.

== Plot ==
The plot revolves around the protagonist, Michael Dillon, and his wife, Moira Dillon, who are held hostage in their house by members of the Provisional Irish Republican Army (IRA). The men force Dillon, an apolitical hotel manager, to drive his bomb-laden car to the hotel that he manages so that they can kill a leading Protestant reverend, members of the Orange Order, and militant Protestants, all of whom are attending the same function.

Various aspects of female psychology are also present throughout the novel, including Dillon's extramarital affair with the Canadian writer Andrea and Moira's mental breakdown following the revelation of his infidelity.

== Reception ==
Upon its publication, Lies of Silence received positive acclaim internationally. Publishers Weekly described it as "Moore's most powerful, meaningful and timely novel", the Toronto Sun said that "once again Brian Moore proves his astonishing versatility and compelling humanity as a writer," the Irish Independent noted that "the writing is crisp and taut" and that "the moral crises [...] are intensely complex and gripping," and Francine Prose in The New York Times described it as "characteristically first rate... intelligent... brilliant." Lies of Silence was one of six books shortlisted for the 1990 Man Booker Prize.

Kirkus Reviews noted the novel’s suspenseful structure and its focus on personal choices under political pressure, highlighting its grim, unsurprising revelation at the end. Lies of Silence is a choice for English comparative study for the Leaving Certificate in schools in Ireland.

== Translations ==
- A Finnish language edition, Veren väri, was published in 1997 by Book Studio (ISBN 9516118658)
- A Portuguese language edition, Mentiras de Silêncio, translated by Kátia Maria Orberg and Eliane Fittipaldi Pereira, was published in 1992 by Círculo de Leitores
- A Welsh language edition, Celwyddau Distawrwydd, translated by Nansi Pritchard, was published as by Gwasg Gwynedd in December 1995 (ISBN 0860741214; ISBN 978-0860741213)
- A Spanish language edition, Mentiras del silencio, translated by Aníbal Leal, was published in 1991 by Javier Vergara Editor S.A. (ISBN 9789501511062}
