= I Am Mary Dunne =

1968 novel

- First edition
- Author: Brian Moore
- Publisher: Jonathan Cape
- Publication date: 19 June 1968 (US); 17 October 1968 (UK)
- Preceded by: The Emperor of Ice-Cream (1965)
- Followed by: Fergus (1970)

I Am Mary Dunne is a novel, first published in 1968, by Northern Irish-Canadian writer Brian Moore about one day in the life of a beautiful and well-to-do 31-year-old Canadian woman living in New York City with her third husband, a successful playwright. Triggered by seemingly unimportant occurrences, the protagonist / first person narrator remembers her past in a series of flashbacks, which reveal her insecurities, her bad conscience concerning her first two husbands, and her fear that she is on the brink of insanity.

I Am Mary Dunne has been described as "perhaps [Brian Moore's] best book". Robert Fulford, writing in Canada's The Globe and Mail, calls it "[a] feminist novel written before the wave of feminist novels began".

In its original draft, I Am Mary Dunne was called A Woman of No Identity.
