= Cold Heaven (novel) =

Novel by Brian Moore

- First edition
- Author: Brian Moore
- Language: English
- Publisher: McClelland & Stewart
- Publication date: 1983
- Publication place: United States
- Pages: 265
- ISBN: 978-0-03-063257-0
- OCLC: 8907243
- Preceded by: The Temptation of Eileen Hughes (1981)
- Followed by: Black Robe (1985)

Cold Heaven is a novel by Northern Irish-Canadian writer Brian Moore. It was published in 1983.

== Plot ==
The novel is set in Nice, New York and Carmel, California. The plot concerns a lapsed Catholic, Marie Davenport, who is about to leave her husband Alex for her lover, Daniel, when Alex is apparently killed in a boating accident and then seems to have risen from the dead. The novel details Marie's dilemma in confronting this apparent miracle.

== Autobiographical reference ==
Alex's accident references an event in Moore's own life. In 1956, he was hit by a motorboat while swimming in a lake in Canada and sustained multiple fractures to his skull.

== Reception ==
Frances Taliaferro, reviewing the book for The New York Times, described Cold Heaven as "a chilly disappointment, a cheerless novel". She said "Brian Moore's intentions for this novel are unclear. It begins with promising urgency and looks as if it will turn into a psychological thriller, but the initial suspense declines into anticlimax. To readers who are already disposed to believe in miracles, the Carmel sections may be gratifying, but the unconverted will find neither a satisfying exploration of the psychology of visions nor a fully realized portrait of the sinner who becomes God's unwilling agent."

The title and metaphysical implications of Cold Heaven, according to Hallvard Dahlie, reflect W B Yeats's continuing influence on Moore. There are, he says, "many echoes of his earlier novels, in its settings of Nice, New York and Carmel, and in its exploitation of such recurring concerns as marital infidelity, guilt and the day-to-day conflicts between faith and disbelief, between free will and various forms of determinism... Our capitulation at the outset to the basic elements of the 'thriller' story... is soon reinforced by our involvement with Marie's metaphysical and spiritual dilemmas, and we are not entirely certain whether she is free at the end, or whether she is still to be, as Yeats states in his poem of the same title, 'stricken by the injustice of the skies for punishment'".

Kirkus Reviews said: "this intriguing, half-satisfying novel is finally an entertainment, a theological Twilight Zone episode, a modernized Bernadette of Lourdes--instead of the electrifying parable that a French writer, a Mauriac or a Leon Bloy, say, might have made out of the premises and tensions of the same material."

David Pringle included Cold Heaven as Number 83 in his 1988 book, Modern Fantasy: The Hundred Best Novels.

== Film adaptation ==
The novel was made into a film in 1991. Directed by Nicolas Roeg, the adaptation stars Theresa Russell as Marie, Mark Harmon as Alex and James Russo as Daniel. The screenplay was written by Allan Scott.
