= Linda Rogers (poet) =

Canadian poet and children's writer (born 1944)

- Born: Linda Rogers; October 10, 1944 (age 81); Port Alice, British Columbia
- Education: University of British Columbia
- Occupation: Author
- Spouse: Rick Van Krugel
- Children: 3
- Writing career
- Genres: Poetry, Children's Literature

Linda Rogers (born 10 October 1944) is a Canadian poet and children's writer based in British Columbia.

== Early life and education ==
Rogers was born October 10, 1944, in Port Alice, British Columbia. Rogers attended the University of British Columbia. She was raised in Vancouver and attended University Hill School. She graduated with BA in English in 1966 and an MA in Canadian Literature in 1970.

== Career ==
Rogers began publishing chapbooks in the 1970s. One of her first full-length titles, Queens of the Next Hot Star (1981), is based on her relationships with First Nations women.

In addition to writing, Rogers has taught at the University of British Columbia, the University of Victoria, Malaspina College and Camosun College. Rogers served as president of the League of Canadian Poets (1997) and the Federation of BC Writers (1990). From 1 December 1988, Rogers served as the second Poet Laureate of the City of Victoria.

== Personal life ==
Rogers married musician Rick Van Krugel. She has three sons from a previous marriage.

== Bibliography ==
=== Poetry ===
- Some Breath (1976)
- Queens of the Next Hot Star (1981)
- Witness (1985)
- Singing Rib (1987)
- Woman at Mile Zero (1990)
- Letters from the Doll Hospital (1992)
- Hard Candy (1994)
- Love in the Rainforest (1995)
- Heaven Cake (1997)
- The Broad Canvas (1999)
- The Saning (1999)
- 2000: Shaunt Basmajian Chapbook Award, Grief Sits Down ISBN 0-9686018-2-0
- The Bursting Test (2002)

=== Children's books ===
- Worm Sandwich (1989)
- Kestrel and Leonardo (1990)
- Brown Bag Blues (1991)
- The Magic Flute (1991)
- Frankie Zapper and the Disappearing Teacher (1994)
- Molly Brown is Not a Clown (1996)

=== Fiction ===
- The Half Life of Radium (1994)
- Say My Name: The Memoirs of Charlie Louie (2000)
- Friday Water (2003)
- The Empress Letters (2007)

=== Non-fiction ===
- The Broad Canvas: Portraits of Women Artists (1999)

=== Anthologies ===
- Breaking the Surface: Five Canadian Poets Introduce New Voices (2001)
- P.K. Page: Essays on Her Works (2001)
- Bill Bissett: Essays on His Works (2002)
- Al Purdy: Essays on His Works (2002)
- Joe Rosenblatt: Essays on His Works (2005)
- George Fetherling and His Work (2005)
