= Brian Busby =

Canadian literary historian and anthologist

Brian John Busby (born August 29, 1962) is a Canadian literary historian and anthologist. Born and raised in Montreal, Quebec, he attended John Abbott College and Concordia University. Busby began his writing career writing daytime soap operas and educational material for Radio Canada International.

He is best known for his biography of John Glassco, A Gentleman of Pleasure: One Life of John Glassco, Poet, Memoirist, Translator, and Pornographer (ISBN 978-0773538184) and for his 2003 book Character Parts: Who's Really Who in Canlit (ISBN 0-676-97579-8), which discusses the real-life inspirations behind characters in Canadian fiction.

He is a former president of the Federation of BC Writers.

== See also ==
- Brian Moore's early fiction
