= Hayden Murphy =

Irish editor, literary critic and poet (born 1945)

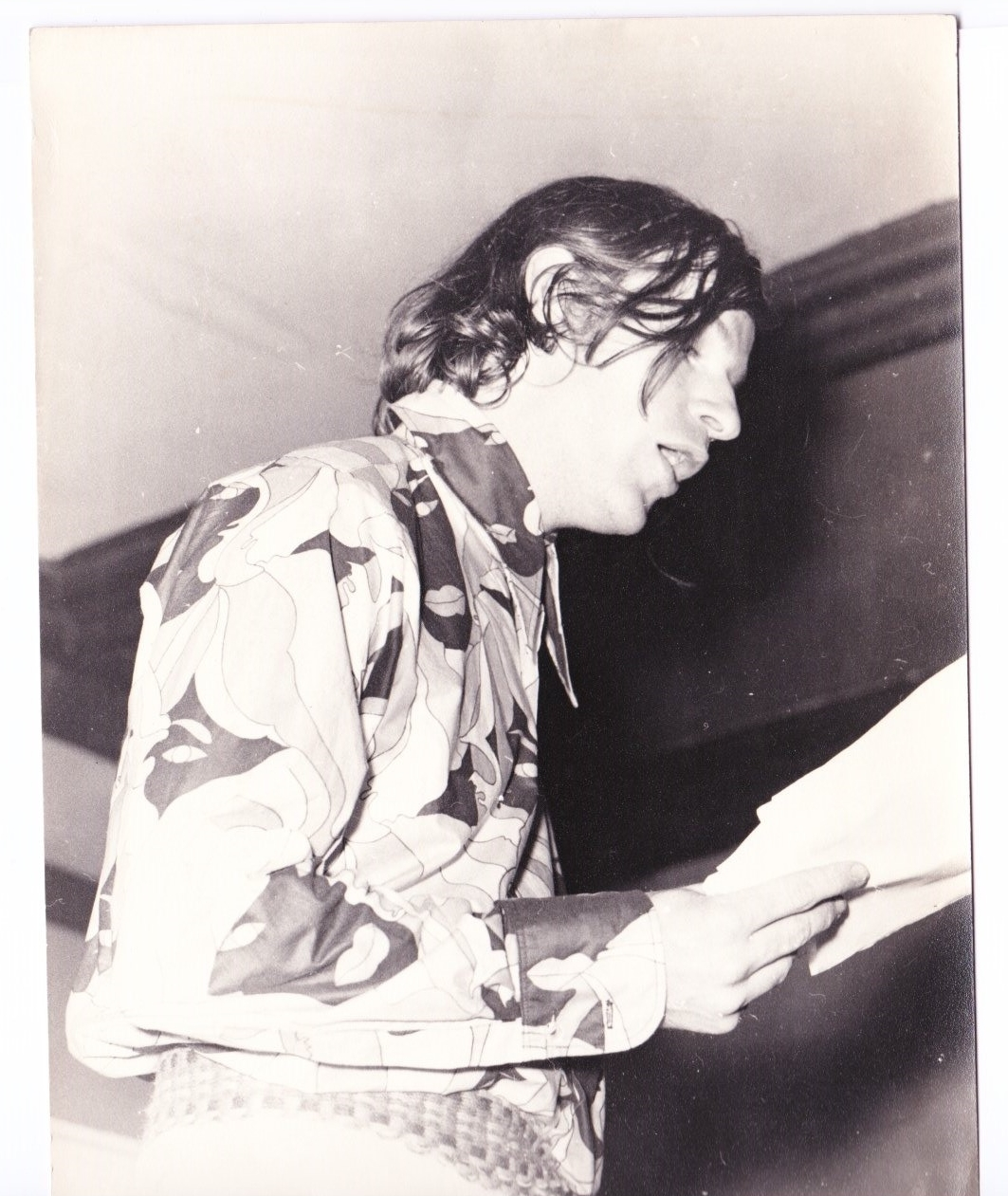
Hayden Murphy c.1969

Hayden Murphy (born 1945) is an Irish editor, literary critic and poet. He was born in Dublin, and brought up there and in Limerick. He was educated at Blackrock College and Trinity College, Dublin.

Murphy was election agent for Eoin O'Mahony's unsuccessful attempt to run in the 1966 Irish presidential election. During 1967-78 he edited, published, and personally distributed Broadsheet, which contained poetry and graphics. In the mid-1970s, he contributed reviews of collections and recordings of poetry to the Scottish politics, current affairs, history and the arts review, Calgacus.

== Selected works ==
- Flames of History, illustrations by John Behan (1999)
- Wedded Echoes (1995)
- Exile's Journal: A Poem Sequence, with Hugh Bryden (Jun 1992)
- Broadsheet: Poetry, Prose and Graphics: Exhibition Catalogue (1983)
- Places Of Glass (1979)
- Considering... (1977)
- Broadsheet, No.19 (1972)
- Poems (1967)
