= Judith Hearne =

1955 novel by writer Brian Moore

- First edition
- Author: Brian Moore
- Cover artist: Heather Standring
- Publisher: Andre Deutsch
- Publication date: 1955
- Publication place: United Kingdom
- Media type: Print
- Pages: 223
- OCLC: 625517
- Preceded by: A Bullet for My Lady (as Bernard Mara) (1955)
- Followed by: This Gun for Gloria (as Bernard Mara) (1956)

Judith Hearne (later republished as The Lonely Passion of Judith Hearne after the film of that name, based on the novel), was regarded by Northern Irish-Canadian writer Brian Moore as his first novel. The book was published in 1955 after Moore had left Ireland and was living in Canada. It was rejected by 10 American publishers, then was accepted by a British publisher. Diana Athill's memoir Stet (2000) has information about the publishing of Judith Hearne.

Set in Belfast in the 1950s, Judith Hearne has been described as "a sensitive study of a middle-aged alcoholic woman in drab Belfast and her desperate last attempts at finding love and companionship". Ann Leary, reviewing the book for NPR, calls it "a short book about a lifetime of longing" and says "Moore uses brilliant economy in his writing; it's as if words are as scarce and precious as sunshine in this gloomy section of postwar Belfast". According to Colm Tóibín, the book "is full of Joycean moments... it takes from ‘Clay’, the most mysterious story in Dubliners, the idea of a single, middle-aged woman visiting a family and finding both comfort and humiliation there". Robert Fulford, writing in Canada's The Globe and Mail, describes it as "a bleak post-Catholic novel" that depicts "a desolate life, stripped of warming humanity".

Moore won the Authors' Club First Novel Award and the Beta Sigma Phi award for this work, although it was not his first novel.

A film based on the book, but with the story relocated to Dublin, was released in 1987 with Maggie Smith in the title role.

The book was republished by HarperCollins, under the title The Lonely Passion of Judith Hearne, on 16 July 2007 in the Harper Perennial Modern Classics series (ISBN 0007255616; ISBN 978-0007255610).

== Critical reception ==
In November 2019, BBC Arts included Judith Hearne on its list of the 100 most influential novels.

Commenting in the Belfast Telegraph, writer Carlo Gébler stated: " [T]he author communicates her specificity (she is a lonely, damaged, needy, alcoholic, Catholic middle-aged woman who yearns for love) with enormous tenderness and precision." His technique, he added: "combines third person omniscient narrative with first person stream of consciousness material: by combining the two (and he does this deftly) Moore...tells his story and he allows us unfettered access to the private interior world of the people he is writing about."
