= Patrick Hicks =

American poet

Patrick Hicks (born 1970 in Charlotte, North Carolina ) is an Irish-American novelist, poet, and Writer-in-Residence at Augustana University.

== Life ==
From Stillwater, Minnesota, much of his fiction is an examination of The Holocaust, but his poetry often discusses his experiences in Northern Ireland, Germany, and Spain. Hicks is a dual citizen of the United States and Ireland. He holds degrees from College of Saint Benedict and Saint John's University, DePaul University, Queen's University of Belfast (Northern Ireland), and the University of Sussex (England).

Patrick Hicks is the author of The Commandant of Lubizec: A Novel of the Holocaust and Operation Reinhard, which was published by Steerforth/Random House to critical and popular acclaim, and was one of only 20 books chosen for National Reading Group Month. He is also the author of eight poetry collections, including Library of the Mind, Adoptable, This London, and Finding the Gossamer-—his short story collection, The Collector of Names, was published by Schaffner Press. His work has appeared in some of the most vital literary journals in America, including Ploughshares, Glimmer Train, The Missouri Review, Alaska Quarterly Review, Guernica, Salon, Huffington Post, Prairie Schooner, NPR, and The PBS NewsHour, among many others. He has been nominated seven times for the Pushcart Prize, he was recently a finalist for a High Plains Book Award, the Dzanc Short Story Collection Competition, the Gival Press Novel Award, and the Steinberg Essay Prize from Fourth Genre. He has twice been nominated for an Emmy. A winner of the Glimmer Train Fiction Award, he is also the recipient of a number of grants, including individual artist awards from the Bush Foundation, The Loft Literary Center, the South Dakota Arts Council, and the National Endowment for the Humanities. He is the host and curator of the popular radio show, Poetry from Studio 47, which airs on affiliate NPR stations.

He is the writer-in-residence at Augustana University as well as a faculty member at the MFA program at University of Nevada, Reno. After living in Europe for many years, he lives in the Midwest.

== Works ==
=== Fiction ===
- Across the Lake: A Novel of the Holocaust and Ravensbrück (2023).
- In the Shadow of Dora: A Novel of the Holocaust and the Apollo Program (2020).
- The Collector of Names: Stories (2015).
- The Commandant of Lubizec: A Novel of the Holocaust and Operation Reinhard (2014).

=== Poetry ===
- Library of the Mind: New & Selected Poems (2019)
- Adoptable (2014)
- A Harvest of Words, Editor (2010)
- This London (2010).
- Finding the Gossamer (2008)
- The Kiss That Saved My Life (2007)
- Traveling Through History (2005)
- Draglines (2006)
- Traveling Through History (2005)

=== Non-fiction ===
- Greater Minnesota: Exploring the Land of Sky-Blue Waters (2025)
- City of Hustle: The Sioux Falls Anthology (2022) – co-edited with Jon Lauck and part of Belt Publishing's "City Series"
- Brian Moore and the Meaning of the Past (2007) – a critical retrospective of the work of Irish-Canadian novelist Brian Moore
