= Brian Moore (novelist) =

Novelist and screenwriter from Northern Ireland

- Born: 25 August 1921; Belfast, Northern Ireland
- Died: 11 January 1999 (aged 77); Malibu, California, U.S.
- Occupations: Novelist, screenwriter, journalist
- Spouses: Jacqueline ("Jackie") Sirois (née Scully) (m. 1952–1967) Jean Russell (née Denney) (m. 1967–1999)
- Children: Michael Moore
- Relatives: Eoin MacNeill (uncle)
- Writing career
- Language: English
- Genres: Realism, historical fiction, fantasy, science fiction
- Notable awards: Authors' Club First Novel Award (1955); James Tait Black Memorial Prize (1975); Governor General's Award for English-language fiction (1960 and 1975); The Sunday Express Book of the Year (1987); Los Angeles Times Robert Kirsch Award for Lifetime Achievement (1994)

Brian Moore (/ˈbriːən/ BREE-an; 25 August 1921 – 11 January 1999), was a Northern Irish and Canadian writer. He was acclaimed for the descriptions in his novels of life in Northern Ireland during and after the Second World War, in particular his explorations of the inter-communal divisions of The Troubles, and has been described as "one of the few genuine masters of the contemporary novel".

He was awarded the James Tait Black Memorial Prize in 1975 and the inaugural Sunday Express Book of the Year award in 1987, and he was shortlisted for the Booker Prize three times (in 1976, 1987 and 1990). Moore also wrote screenplays and several of his books were made into films. For the 1991 film adaptation of his historical novel Black Robe (1985) he won a Genie Award, a Canadian Screen Award for Best Screenplay.

== Early life and education ==
Moore was born and grew up in Belfast with eight siblings in a large Roman Catholic family. His grandfather, a severe, authoritarian solicitor, had been a Catholic convert. His father, James Bernard Moore, was a prominent surgeon and an observant Catholic and his mother, Eileen McFadden Moore, a farmer's daughter from County Donegal, was a nurse. His uncle was the prominent Irish nationalist Eoin MacNeill, founder of Conradh na Gaeilge (the Gaelic League) and Professor of Irish at University College Dublin.

Moore was educated at Newington Elementary School and St Malachy's College, Belfast. He left the college in 1939, having failed his senior exams. The physical description of the school at the heart of The Feast of Lupercal matches closely that of Moore's alma mater and is widely held to be a lightly fictionalised setting of the college as he remembered its negative aspects.

== Wartime service and move to North America ==
Moore was a volunteer air raid warden during the Second World War and served during the Belfast Blitz in April and May 1941. He went on to serve as a civilian with the British Army in North Africa, Italy and France. After the war ended he worked in Eastern Europe for the United Nations Relief and Rehabilitation Administration.

in 1948 he emigrated to Canada to work as a reporter for the Montreal Gazette, and became a Canadian citizen. Moore lived in Canada from 1948 to 1958. He moved to New York City in 1959 to take up a Guggenheim Fellowship and continued to live there until he and his first wife divorced in 1967.

Moore moved to the West Coast of the United States with his new wife Jean, settling in Malibu, California and teaching creative writing at UCLA. While eventually making his primary residence in California, Moore continued to live part of each year in Canada up to his death.

== Novels and themes ==
Moore wrote his first novels in Canada. His earliest books were thrillers, published under his own name or using the pseudonyms Bernard Mara or Michael Bryan. The first two of these pieces of pulp fiction, all of which he later disowned, were published in Canada by Harlequin – Wreath for a Redhead in March 1951 and The Executioners in July 1951.

Judith Hearne, which Moore regarded as his first novel and was the first he produced outside the thriller genre, remains among his most highly regarded. The book was rejected by ten American publishers before being accepted by a British publisher. It was adapted as a film, with British actress Maggie Smith playing the lonely spinster who is the book/film's title character.

Other novels by Moore were also adapted for the screen, including Intent to Kill, The Luck of Ginger Coffey, Catholics, Black Robe, Cold Heaven, and The Statement. He co-wrote the screenplay for Alfred Hitchcock's Torn Curtain, and wrote the screenplay for The Blood of Others. This was based on the novel Le Sang des autres by Simone de Beauvoir.

Moore criticised his Belfast Catholic schooling through his novels The Feast of Lupercal and The Emperor of Ice-Cream. Some of his novels feature staunchly anti-doctrinaire and anti-clerical themes. In particular, he spoke strongly about the effect of the Church on life in Ireland. A recurring theme in his novels is the concept of the Catholic priesthood. On several occasions, he explores the idea of a priest losing his faith. At the same time, several of his novels are deeply sympathetic and affirming portrayals of the struggles of faith and religious commitment, Black Robe most prominently.

== Acclaim ==
Graham Greene said that Moore was his favourite living novelist, though Moore began to regard the label as "a bit of an albatross".

== Personal life ==
Moore was married twice. His first marriage, in 1952, was to Jacqueline ("Jackie") Sirois (née Scully), a French Canadian and fellow journalist with whom he had a son, Michael (who became a professional photographer), in 1953. They divorced in October 1967 and Jackie died in January 1976. Moore married his second wife, Jean Russell (née Denney), a former commentator on Canadian TV, in October 1967.

Moore's beachside house in Malibu, California was celebrated in Seamus Heaney's poem Remembering Malibu. Moore's widow, Jean, lived in the house until it was destroyed in 2018 in the Woolsey Fire.

== Death ==
Brian Moore died at his Malibu home on 11 January 1999, aged 77, from pulmonary fibrosis. He had been working on a novel about the 19th-century French symbolist poet Arthur Rimbaud. His last published work, written just before his death, was an essay entitled "Going Home". It was a reflection inspired by a visit he made to the grave in Connemara of his family friend, the Irish republican Bulmer Hobson. The essay was commissioned by Granta and published in The New York Times on 7 February 1999. Despite Moore's often conflicted attitude to Ireland and his Irishness, his concluding reflection in the piece was "The past is buried until, in Connemara, the sight of Bulmer Hobson's grave brings back those faces, those scenes, those sounds and smells which now live only in my memory. And in that moment I know that when I die I would like to come home at last to be buried here in this quiet place among the grazing cows."

== Legacy ==
In 1996, the Creative Writers Network in Northern Ireland launched the Brian Moore Short Story Awards. The awards scheme continued until 2008 and is now defunct.

Moore has been the subject of two biographies: Brian Moore: The Chameleon Novelist (1998) by Denis Sampson and Brian Moore: A Biography (2002) by Patricia Craig. Brian Moore and the Meaning of the Past (2007) by Patrick Hicks provides a critical retrospective of Moore's works. Information about the publishing of Moore's novel Judith Hearne, and the break-up of his marriage can be found in Diana Athill's memoir Stet (2000).

In 1975, Moore arranged for his literary materials, letters and documents to be deposited in the Special Collections Division of the University of Calgary Library, an inventory of which was published by the University of Calgary Press in 1987. Moore's archives, which include unfilmed screenplays, drafts of various novels, working notes, a 42-volume journal (1957–1998), and his correspondence, are now at The Harry Ransom Humanities Research Center, at the University of Texas at Austin.

To mark the centenary in 2021 of Moore's birth, a project − Brian Moore at 100 − funded by a British Academy/Leverhulme Trust Small Research Grant, sought to re-appraise his work, and revive scholarly and public interest in it. The project included a programme of research, public-facing events and an international academic conference.

In 2023 an Ulster History Circle blue plaque was unveiled by the Lord Mayor of Belfast, close to where Moore was born.

== Prizes and honours ==
- 1955 Beta Sigma Phi award (best first novel by a Canadian author for Judith Hearne)
- 1955 Authors' Club First Novel Award (for Judith Hearne, chosen by C.S. Forester)
- 1959 Guggenheim Fellowship for Fiction
- 1960 Governor General's Award for Fiction (for The Luck of Ginger Coffey)
- 1975 James Tait Black Memorial Prize for Fiction (for The Great Victorian Collection)
- 1975 Governor General's Award for Fiction (for The Great Victorian Collection)
- 1976 Nominee, Booker Prize (for The Doctor's Wife)
- 1987 Nominee, Booker Prize (for The Colour of Blood)
- 1987 The Sunday Express Book of the Year (for The Colour of Blood)
- 1987 Honorary doctorate from Queen's University Belfast
- 1990 Nominee, Booker Prize (for Lies of Silence)
- 1991 Genie Award, a Canadian Screen Award for Best Screenplay (for the film adaptation of Black Robe}
- 1994 Robert Kirsch Award for Lifetime Achievement by the Los Angeles Times for his novels

== Bibliography ==
=== Non-fiction and essays ===
- (with the editors of Life) Canada (1963)
- "Now and Then", in Threshold 23: The Northern Crisis, edited by John Montague. Belfast: Lyric Players Theatre (1970). Republished as "Bloody Ulster: An Irishman's Lament" in The Atlantic, September 1970
- "Old Father, Old Artificer", in Irish University Review 12 (Spring 1982), chapter 12 (on James Joyce)
- "Going Home" in The New York Times, 7 February 1999

=== Novels ===
- Wreath for a Redhead (1951) (U.S. title: Sailor's Leave, published 1953)
- The Executioners (1951)
- French for Murder (1954) (as Bernard Mara)
- A Bullet for My Lady (1955) (as Bernard Mara)
- Judith Hearne (1955) (reprinted as The Lonely Passion of Judith Hearne in 1956)
- This Gun for Gloria (1956) (as Bernard Mara)
- Intent to Kill (1956) (as Michael Bryan)
- The Feast of Lupercal (1957) (reprinted as A Moment of Love in 1969)
- Murder in Majorca (1957) (as Michael Bryan)
- The Luck of Ginger Coffey (1960)
- An Answer from Limbo (1962)
- The Emperor of Ice-Cream (1965)
- I Am Mary Dunne (1968)
- Fergus (1970)
- The Revolution Script (1971)
- Catholics (1972, first printed in New American Review 15 (New York: Simon & Schuster 1972) pp. 11–72
- The Great Victorian Collection (1975)
- The Doctor's Wife (1976)
- The Mangan Inheritance (1979) (originally published as The Family Album)
- The Temptation of Eileen Hughes (1981)
- Cold Heaven (1983)
- Black Robe (1985)
- The Colour of Blood (1987)
- Lies of Silence (1990)
- No Other Life (1993)
- The Statement (1995)
- The Magician's Wife (1997)

=== Short story collections ===
- Two Stories (1978), Northridge, California: Santa Susana Press. Contains "Uncle T" and "Preliminary Pages for a Work of Revenge" ISBN 978-0937048221
- The Dear Departed: Selected Short Stories (2020), London: Turnpike Books ISBN 9781916254701

=== Short stories ===
- "Sassenach", Northern Review 5 (October–November 1951)
- "Fly Away Finger, Fly Away Thumb", London Mystery Magazine, 17, September 1953 : reprinted in Haining, Peter (ed.) Great Irish Tales of Horror, Souvenir Press 1995; and reprinted in Moore, Brian. The Dear Departed: Selected Short Stories (2020). London: Turnpike Books.
- "The Specialist", Bluebook, March 1953
- "Enemies of the People", Bluebook, May 1953
- "The Ridiculous Proposal", Bluebook, January 1954
- "A Vocation", Tamarack Review 1 (Autumn 1956): 18–22; reprinted in Threshold 2 (Summer 1958): 21–25; reprinted in Garrity, Devin A (ed.) The Irish Genius, (1960). New York: New American Library, pp. 125–128; reprinted for the Verbal Arts Centre project, 1998; and reprinted in Moore, Brian. The Dear Departed: Selected Short Stories (2020). London: Turnpike Books.
- "Lion of the Afternoon", The Atlantic, November 1957; reprinted in Pacey, Desmond (ed.) A Book of Canadian Stories (1962). Toronto: Ryerson Press, pp. 283–293 and reprinted in Moore, Brian. The Dear Departed: Selected Short Stories (2020). London: Turnpike Books
- "Next Thing was Kansas City", The Atlantic, February 1959
- "Grieve for the Dear Departed", The Atlantic, August 1959; reprinted in Pudney, John (ed.) Pick of Today's Short Stories, no. 12 (1960). London: Putnam, pp. 179–188 and reprinted in Moore, Brian. The Dear Departed: Selected Short Stories (2020). London: Turnpike Books
- "Uncle T", Gentleman's Quarterly, November 1960; reprinted in Moore, Brian. Two Stories (1978), Northridge, California: Santa Susana Press and also in Moore, Brian. The Dear Departed: Selected Short Stories (2020), Turnpike Books
- "Preliminary Pages for a Work of Revenge", Midstream 7 (Winter 1961); reprinted in Montague, John and Kinsella, Thomas (eds.) The Dolmen: Miscellany of Irish Writing (1962), Dublin: Dolman, pp. 1–7; reprinted in Richler, Mordecai (ed.), Canadian Writings Today, Harmondsworth: Penguin Books, pp. 135–145; reprinted in Two Stories, see above and reprinted in Moore, Brian. The Dear Departed: Selected Short Stories (2020). London: Turnpike Books
- "Hearts and Flowers", The Spectator, 24 November 1961; reprinted in Moore, Brian. The Dear Departed: Selected Short Stories (2020). London: Turnpike Books
- "Off the Track", Weaver, Robert (ed.) Ten for Wednesday Night, Toronto: McClelland and Stewart Ltd., 1961, pp. 159–167; reprinted in Giose Rimanelli, Giose; Ruberto, Robert (eds.) (1966), Modern Canadian Stories, Toronto: Ryerson Press, pp. 239–246 and reprinted in Moore, Brian. The Dear Departed: Selected Short Stories (2020). London: Turnpike Books
- "The Sight", Hone, Joseph (ed.) Irish Ghost Stories, London: Hamish Hamilton, 1977, pp. 100–119; reprinted in Manguel, Alberto (ed.) Black Water, Picador 1983; reprinted in Manguel, Alberto (ed.) The Oxford Book of Canadian Ghost Stories. Toronto: Oxford University Press 1990
- "A Bed in America" (unpublished; later used in Hitchcock film Torn Curtain)
- "A Matter of Faith" (unpublished)

=== Playscripts ===
- The Closing Ritual (1979), unperformed
- Catholics (1980), based on his own novel – ACT Theatre, world premiere: Seattle, May 1980
- The Game (undated), unperformed

=== Screenplays ===
- Dustin is Dustin, undated film script, now in University of Calgary Special Collection
- The Goat (1964), film script
- The Luck of Ginger Coffey (1964)
- Torn Curtain (1966)
- The Slave (1967), based on Moore's novel An Answer from Limbo
- Catholics (1973)
- The Closing Ritual (1979)
- The Blood of Others (1984)
- Brainwash (1985)
- The Sight (1985), a half-hour drama based on a short story by Moore
- Il Giorno prima (Control) (1987)
- Gabrielle Chanel (1988)
- The Temptation of Eileen Hughes (TV film; 1988)
- Black Robe (1991)

=== Other films based on Brian Moore's work ===
- Intent to Kill (1958), a film with a screenplay by Jimmy Sangster, based on the novel written by Moore as Michael Bryan
- Uncle T (1985), a half-hour drama, with a script by Gerald Wexler, based on a short story by Moore
- The Lonely Passion of Judith Hearne (1987), a film with a screenplay by Peter Nelson, based on Moore's novel
- Cold Heaven (1991), a film with a screenplay by Allan Scott, based on Moore's novel
- The Statement (2003), a film with a screenplay by Ronald Harwood, based on Moore's novel

=== Films about Brian Moore ===
- The Lonely Passion of Brian Moore (1986), a documentary featuring Moore and looking at what inspired his work
- The Man From God Knows Where (1993), BBC Bookmark profile

=== Interviews ===
- Fulford, Robert. "Robert Fulford Interviews Brian Moore". Tamarack Review 23 (1962), pp. 5–18
- Dahlie, Hallvard. "Brian Moore: An Interview". Tamarack Review 46 (1968), pp. 7–29
- Sale, Richard. "An Interview in London with Brian Moore". Studies in the Novel 1 (Spring 1969), pp. 67–80
- Gallagher, Michael Paul. "Brian Moore Talks to Michael Paul Gallagher", Hibernia (10 October 1969), p. 18
- Cameron, Donald. "Brian Moore". Conversations with Canadian Novelists, 2. Toronto: Macmillan of Canada (1973), pp. 64–85
- Graham, John. "Brian Moore" in Garrett, George, ed., The Writer's Voice: Conversations With Contemporary Writers. New York: William Morrow and Company (1973), pp. 51–74
- Bray, Richard T., ed. "A Conversation with Brian Moore". Critic: A Catholic Review of Books and the Arts 35 (Fall 1976), pp. 42–48
- De Santana, Hubert. "Interview with Brian Moore". Maclean's (11 July 1977), pp. 4–7
- Aris, Stephen. "Moore's Fistful of Dollars", The Sunday Times (October 1977), pp. 37
- Sharp, Rhoderick. "Brian Moore: an author in exile winning with the luck of the Irish", Glasgow Herald, 7 May 1983, p. 7
- Parker, Geoffrey. An Interview with Brian Moore & Bernard MacLaverty, in Hearn, Sheila G. (ed.), Cencrastus No. 14, Autumn 1983, pp. 2 – 4, ISSN 0264-0856
- Crowe, Marie. "Marie Crowe Talks to Belfast Writer Brian Moore", in The Irish Press (21 June 1983), p. 9
- Christie, Tom. "Q&A with Brian Moore: The Mystical World of the Mystery," Los Angeles Reader, 2 September 1983, p. 22
- Meyer, Bruce and O'Riordan, Brian. "Brian Moore: In Celebration of the Commonplace", in In Their Words: Interviews With Fourteen Canadian Novelists. Toronto: House of Anansi Press (1984), pp. 169–83
- Carty, Ciaran. "Ciaran Carty Talks to Brian Moore", Sunday Independent (2 June 1985), p. 14
- Adair, Tom. "The Writer as Exile", in Linen Hall Review, 2:4 (1985), pp. 4–6
- Foster, John Wilson. "Q & A with Brian Moore", in Irish Literary Supplement: A Review of Irish Books (Fall 1985), pp. 44–45
- Haverty, Anne. "The Outsider on the Edge", in Sunday Tribune (3 November 1985)
- O'Donoghue, Andy. "Dialogue", interview with Brian Moore on RTÉ Radio 1 (20 February 1986)
- Battersby, Eileen. "No Faith, No Hope, But Clarity: Eileen Battersby in Belfast With the Novelist Brian Moore", Sunday Tribune, (27 April 1990)
- Carlson, Julia., ed. "Brian Moore" in Banned in Ireland: Censorship and the Irish Writer. University of Georgia Press (1990) ISBN 978-0820312026
- Christie, Tom. "An Irishman In Malibu: Novelist Brian Moore Has Left Behind His Homeland And Dodged Celebrity In Favor Of An Independent-minded And Highly Successful Literary Life", in Los Angeles Times (1 March 1992)
- Ford, Nigel. "An Interview With Brian Moore", on Bookshelf, BBC Radio 4 (5 March 1993)
- O'Donoghue, Jo. "From the Abstract Sands: Interview with Brian Moore", in Books Ireland (November 1995), pp. 269–71
- Battersby, Eileen. "Perennial Outsider", a full-page interview in The Irish Times (12 October 1995)
- Rees, Jasper. "Novel ways to Miss the Booker Prize", in The Independent [UK] (23 September 1997), 'Eye' pp. 3–4
- Hicks, Patrick. "Brian Moore and Patrick Hicks", in Irish University Review Vol. 30, No. 2 (Autumn – Winter, 2000), pp. 315–320 (The last known interview with Brian Moore)
- Kilgallin, Tony. "Brian Moore: 'my real strength is that I am a truthful writer'" in The Irish Times, (5 January 2019) (Previously unpublished interview recorded in 1973 at Moore's home in Malibu)

=== Books and articles about Brian Moore and his work ===
- Athill, Diana. Stet: a memoir, London: Granta, ISBN 1-86207-388-0, 2000
- Craig, Patricia. Brian Moore: A Biography, Bloomsbury Publishing, ISBN 978-0747560043, 2002
- Craig, Patricia. "Brian Moore: a writer who readily accepted the price of his refusal to be typecast", The Irish Times, 16 January 1999.
- Cronin, John. "Ulster's Alarming Novels", Eire-Ireland IV (Winter 1969), p. 27–34
- Cronin, John. "The Reslient Realism of Brian Moore". The Irish University Review. 18: 24–36., 1988
- Dahlie, Hallvard. Brian Moore, Toronto: The Copp Clark Publishing Co., 1969
- Dahlie, Hallvard. Brian Moore, Boston: G. K. Hall & Co., 1981
- Flood, Jeanne. Brian Moore, Lewisburg, Penn.: Bucknell University Press; London: Associated University Presses, 1974
- Foster, John Wilson. "Passage Through Limbo: Brian Moore's North American Novels", Critique XIII (Winter 1971), pp. 5–18
- Foster, John Wilson. Forces and Themes in Ulster Fiction, Dublin: Gill and Macmillan, 1974, pp. 122–130; 151–185
- Hicks, Patrick. "History and Masculinity in Brian Moore's "The Emperor of Ice-Cream", The Canadian Journal of Irish Studies, Vol. 25, No. 1/2 (Jul–Dec 1999), pp. 400–413
- Gearon, Liam. "No other life: Death and Catholicism in the works of Brian Moore", Journal of Beliefs and Values, Vol 19, No 1, pp. 33–46, 1998
- Gearon, Liam. Landscapes of Encounter: The Portrayal of Catholicism in the Novels of Brian Moore, University of Calgary Press, 2002. ISBN 1 55238 048 3
- Hicks, Patrick. "Brian Moore's The Feast of Lupercal and the Constriction of Masculinity", New Hibernia Review, Vol 5, No 3, pp. 101–113, Fómhar/Autumn 2001
- Hicks, Patrick. "The Fourth Master: Reading Brian Moore Reading James Joyce". Ariel. 38: 2–3., Apr–Jul 2007
- Hicks, Patrick. "Sleight-of-Hand: Writing, History and Magic in Brian Moore's The Magician's Wife", Commonwealth Essays and Studies ["Postcolonial Narratives" Issue] 27, 2 (Spring 2005), pp. 87–95.
- Hicks, Patrick. Brian Moore and the Meaning of the Past, Edwin Mellen Press Ltd., ISBN 0773454039, ISBN 978-0773454033, 2007
- Koy, Christopher. "Representations of the Quebecois in Brian Moore's Novels", Considering Identity: Views on Canadian Literature and History, Olomouc: Palacký University Press, 2015, pp. 141–156.
- McSweeney, Kerry. Four Contemporary Novelists. Kingston and Montreal: McGill-Queen's University Press, ISBN 9780773503991, 1983, pp. 55–99
- O'Donoghue, Jo. Brian Moore: A Critical Study, Montreal and Kingston: McGill University Press, 1991
- Prosky, Murray. "The Crisis of Identity in the Novels of Brian Moore", Eire-Ireland VI (Fall 1971), pp. 106–118
- Ricks, C. "The Simple Excellence of Brian Moore". New Statesman, 71: pp. 227–228, 1966
- Sampson, Denis. "'Home: A Moscow of the Mind': Notes on Brian Moore's Transition to North America" in Colby Quarterly, vol. 31, issue 1 (March 1995). pp. 46–54
- Sampson, Denis. Brian Moore: The Chameleon Novelist, Toronto: Doubleday Canada, 1998
- Schumacher, Antje. Brian Moore's Black Robe: Novel, Screenplay(s) and Film (European University Studies. Series 14: Anglo-Saxon Language and Literature. Vol. 494), Frankfurt am Main: Peter Lang. Language: English ISBN 3631603215 ISBN 978-3-631-60321-5, 2010
- Spear, Hilda D., "Two Belfast Novels: An Introduction to the Work of Brian Moore", in Lindsay, Maurice (ed.), The Scottish Review: Arts and Environment 31, August 1983, pp. 33 – 37, ISSN 0140-0894
- Sullivan, Robert. A Matter of Faith: The Fiction of Brian Moore, London and Westport, Connecticut: Praeger, ISBN 978-0313298714, 1996
- Whitehouse, J. C. "Grammars of Assent and Dissent in Graham Greene and Brian Moore" in Whitehouse, J. C. (ed.) Catholics on Literature, Four Courts Press, ISBN 978-1851822768, 1996, pp. 99–107

== See also ==
- List of Northern Irish writers

== Sources ==
- Crowley, Michael. "A Brian Moore Bibliography" in The Canadian Journal of Irish Studies, Vol. 23, No. 2 (Dec 1997), pp. 89–121 DOI: 10.2307/25515225
