= Black Robe =

1985 novel by Brian Moore

- First UK edition
- Author: Brian Moore
- Language: English
- Genre: Historical novel
- Publisher: McClelland and Stewart (Canada); Dutton (USA); Jonathan Cape (UK)
- Publication date: 1985
- Publication place: Canada
- Pages: 246 pp (first Canadian, US and UK editions)
- ISBN: 0-7710-6449-7 (first Canadian edition); ISBN 0-525-24311-9 (first US edition); ISBN 0224023292 (first UK edition)
- OCLC: 16036820
- Preceded by: Cold Heaven (1983)
- Followed by: The Colour of Blood (1987)

Black Robe, first published in 1985, is a historical novel by Brian Moore set in New France in the 17th century. Its central theme is the collision of European and Native American cultures soon after first contact. First Nations peoples historically called French Jesuit priests "Black Robes" because of their religious habit.

The novel was adapted into the 1991 film Black Robe directed by Bruce Beresford, for which Moore wrote the screenplay.

== Plot ==
In Quebec, a tribe of Algonquian agree in exchange for muskets to guide the "Black Robe" (Father Laforgue) and his 20-year-old French assistant, Daniel Davost, for a few weeks upriver to a spot beyond a set of rapids. There, Father Laforgue travels onward to the Huron village of Ihonatiria where a Jesuit mission is already established.

Along the way, Father Laforgue falls under suspicion of being a demon, and his attempts to baptize (convert) his Algonquian guides are unsuccessful. He is captured by unfriendly Iroquois, who torture him, but he escapes and eventually arrives at the fever-ridden Huron village. In exchange for promising them a "water cure" for their sickness, the Hurons agree to be baptized.

== Themes and analysis ==
The novel's colonialism theme is the collision of two cultures as seen through the spiritual beliefs and practices of heathen Indians and Jesuit priests.

According to Moore, what interests him is "the moment in which one's illusions are shattered and one has to live without the faith... which originally sustained them."

== Reception ==
Writing in The New York Times, novelist James Carroll described Black Robe as "an extraordinary novel... in which Brian Moore has brought vividly to life a radically different world and populated it with men and women wholly unlike us. His novel's achievement, however, is that, through the course of its shocking narrative... we recognize its fierce, awful world as the one we live in. We put Mr. Moore's novel down and look at ourselves and our places differently".

Anstiss Drake in the Chicago Tribune praises the novel's "economy of style, vivid characterizations, spellbinding story and a master's touch... He accomplishes a portrait of native tribespeople that is acute and unsentimental. In Laforgue, Moore gives us a type seldom seen nowadays; he has saintly purity and heroism. Laforgue suffers in both mind and spirit on his quest; for his God he walks into a wilderness from which he will never return".

== Translations ==
- French: Robe Noire, trans. Ivan Steenhout, Payot, 1986, ISBN 978-2-228-75060-8
- Italian: Manto nero, trans. M. Murzi, Narrativa Piemme, 1992, ISBN 88-384-1653-2
- German: Schwarzrock, trans. Otto von Bayer, Zürich: Diogenes Verlag, 1987, ISBN 3-257-21755-2
- Polish: Czarna suknia, trans. Andrzej Pawelec, Kraków: Graffiti, 1992, ISBN 978-83-85695-20-2
- Czech: Černé roucho, trans. Roman Tadič, Praha: Volvox Globator, 2022, ISBN 978-80-7511-696-3

== Bibliography ==
- Hicks, Patrick. "The Language of the Tribes in Brian Moore's 'Black Robe'" in Studies: An Irish Quarterly Review, Vol. 93, No. 372 (Winter, 2004), pp. 415–426. Irish Province of the Society of Jesus
- Schumacher, Antje. Brian Moore's Black Robe: Novel, Screenplay(s) and Film (European University Studies. Series 14: Anglo-Saxon Language and Literature. Vol. 494), Frankfurt am Main: Peter Lang. Language: English ISBN 978-3-631-60321-5, 2010
