= Patricia Craig (writer) =

Northern Irish writer and anthropologist

Patricia Craig (born 1940s (Note: Craig stated that she was a 20-something in the late 1960s, which would have meant that she was likely born in the 1940s. There are sources that state that her year of birth is 1952, and in 2015, the Belfast Telegraph stated that she was 63, which would mean she was born about 1952. One source states that she was born on 16 January 1949. The Independent states that she was born after the war and grew up in the 1950s. It is also believed that her year of birth was 1942.)) is a writer, anthologist and literary critic from Northern Ireland, living in Antrim, County Antrim.

== Personal life ==
She was born in Belfast to Nora (née Brady) and Andy Craig and attended St Dominic's Grammar School for Girls before studying at the Belfast School of Art and then at the Central School of Arts and Crafts, London (where she obtained a Diploma in Art & Design, Hons.). She returned to Northern Ireland in 1999. She is married to the Welsh artist Jeffrey Morgan.

== Career ==
In the late 1960s, Craig was at Notre Dame Convent School in Battersea, working as an art mistress, but longed to have a literary career. Since then, she has written memoirs, edited several anthologies and written articles for newspapers. In London, she began to collaborate with Mary Cadogan, editing several books on children's literature. Their first book, You’re a Brick, Angela!, became a classic.

On her return to Northern Ireland, she began to write books with an Irish theme. One of the first was a biography of Brian Moore that was described by the critic Seamus Deane as "a crisp and intelligent account of a man and a writer for whom Craig's clean and incisive approach seems perfectly appropriate". Perhaps her most popular book was the memoir Asking for Trouble (1987), which details her schooldays, culminating in her expulsion from school.

== Awards ==
She was Honorary Lecturer at Queen's University Belfast where she was appointed to the Board of the Seamus Heaney Centre for Poetry.

== Publications ==
- You're a Brick, Angela!: The Girls' Story 1839–1985 (1976)
- Women and Children First: The Fiction of Two World Wars (1978)
- The Lady Investigates: Women Detectives and Spies in Fiction (1986)
- The Oxford Book of English Detective Stories (1990)
- The Rattle of The North: An Anthology of Ulster Prose (1992)
- The Penguin Book of British Comic Stories (1992)
- The Oxford Book of Modern Women's Stories (1994)
- The Oxford Book of Schooldays (1995)
- The Oxford Book of Travel Stories (1996)
- The Oxford Book of Ireland (1998)
- Twelve Irish Ghost Stories (1998)
- The Belfast Anthology (1999)
- The Oxford Book of Detective Stories (2000)
- Brian Moore: A Biography (2002)
- Asking for Trouble (2008)
- A Twisted Root – Ancestral Entanglements in Ireland (2012)
- Bookworm, A Memoir of Childhood Reading (2015)
