= Lüleburgaz =

- Municipality
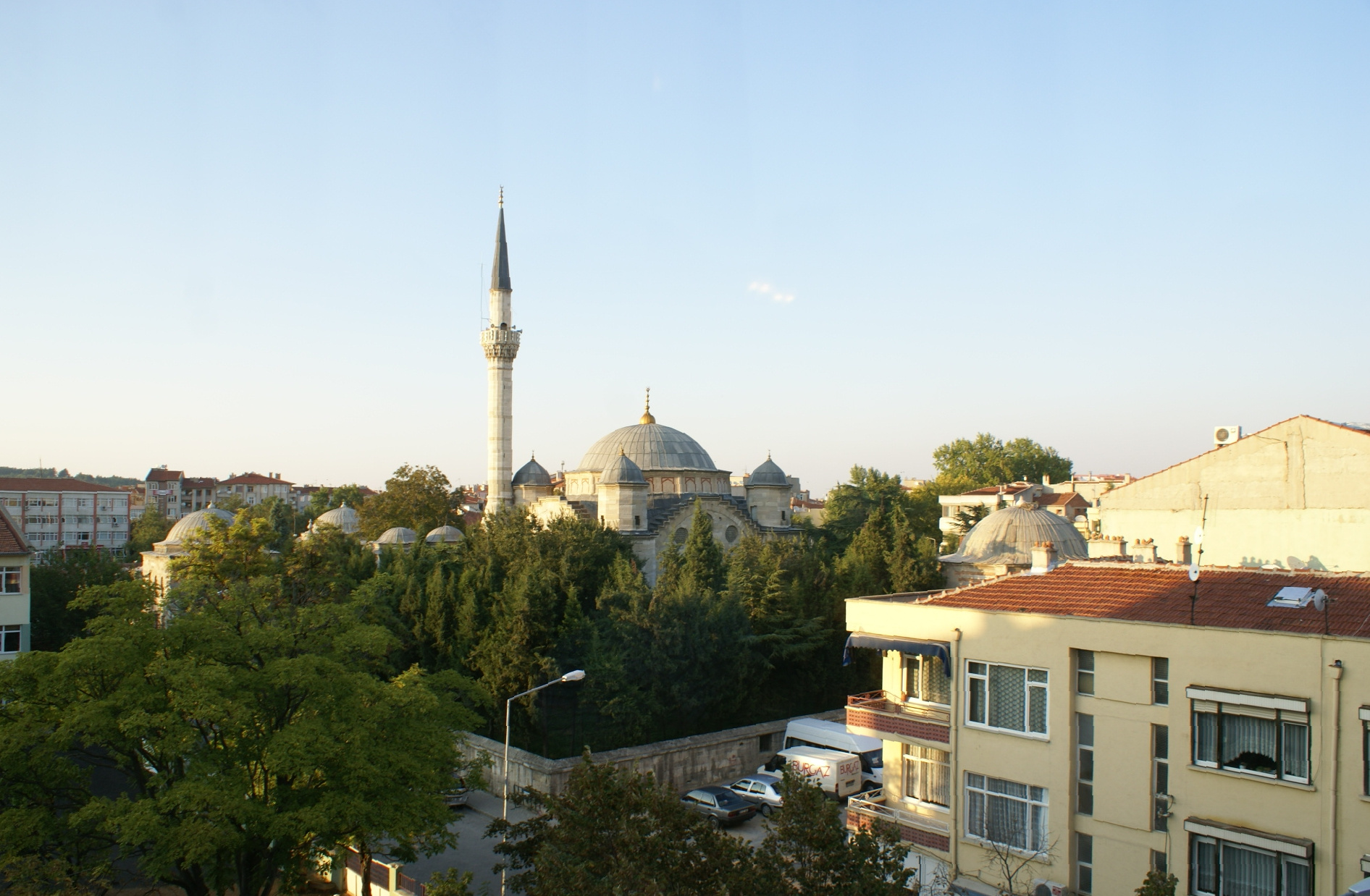
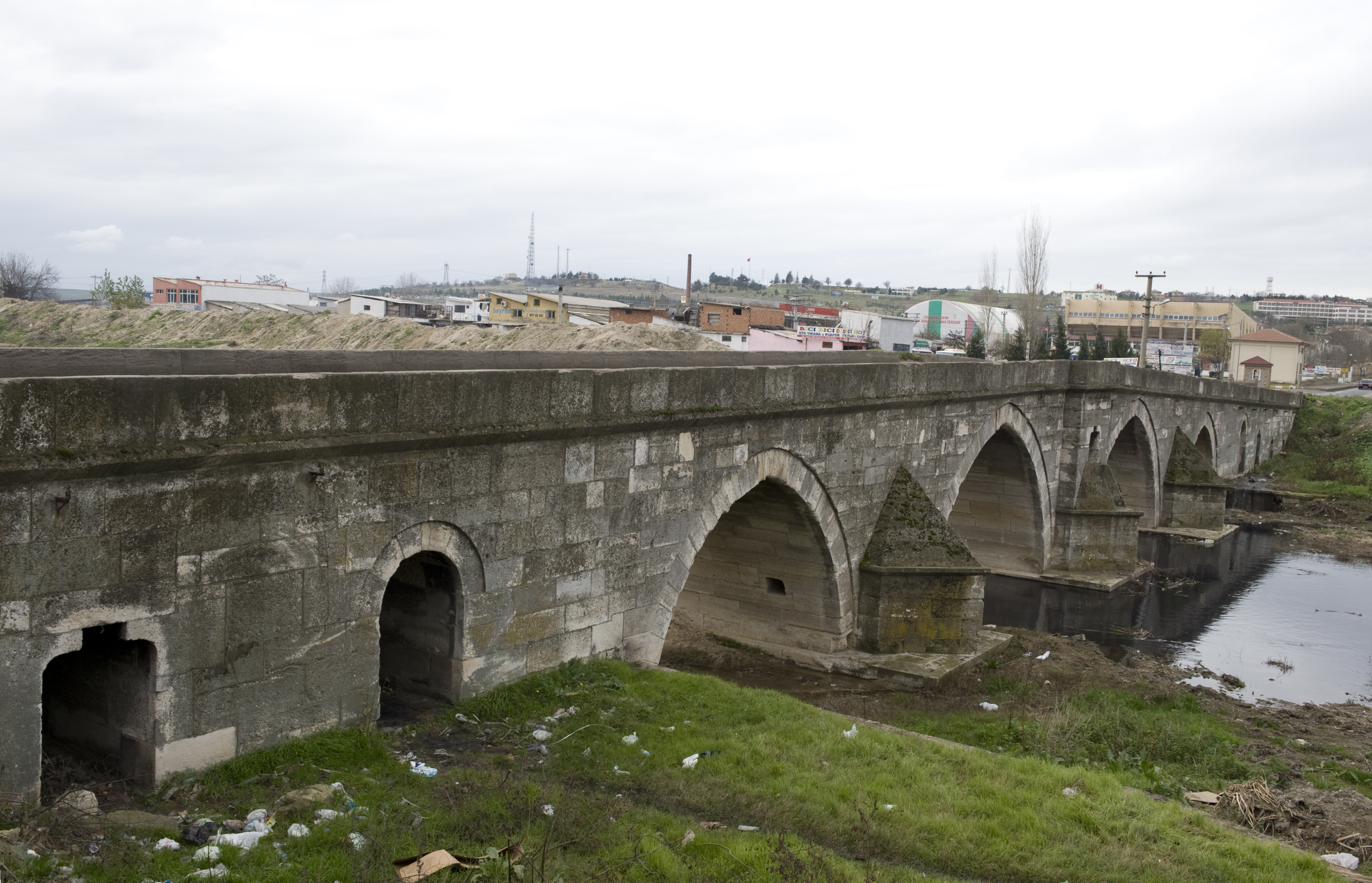
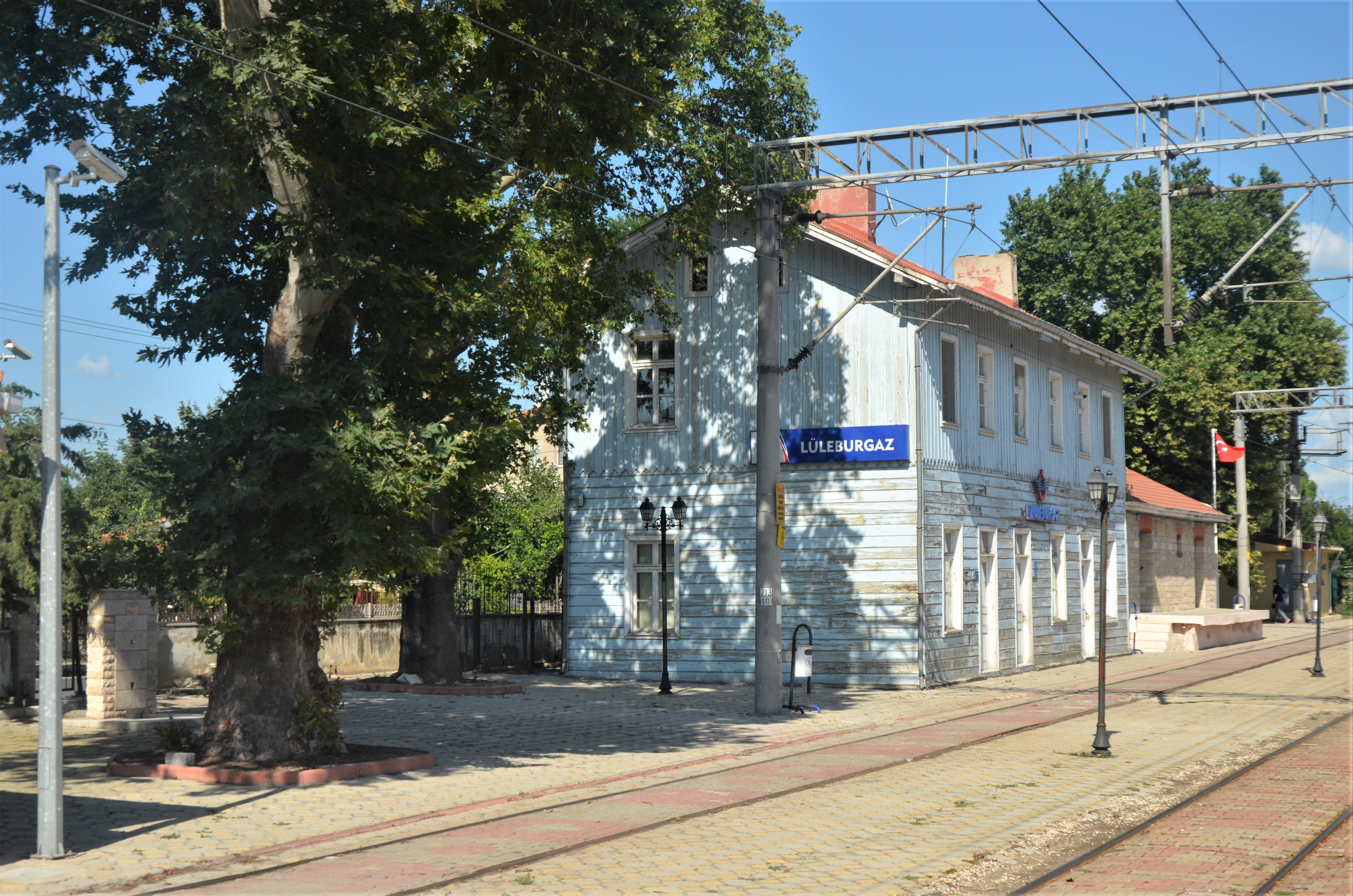
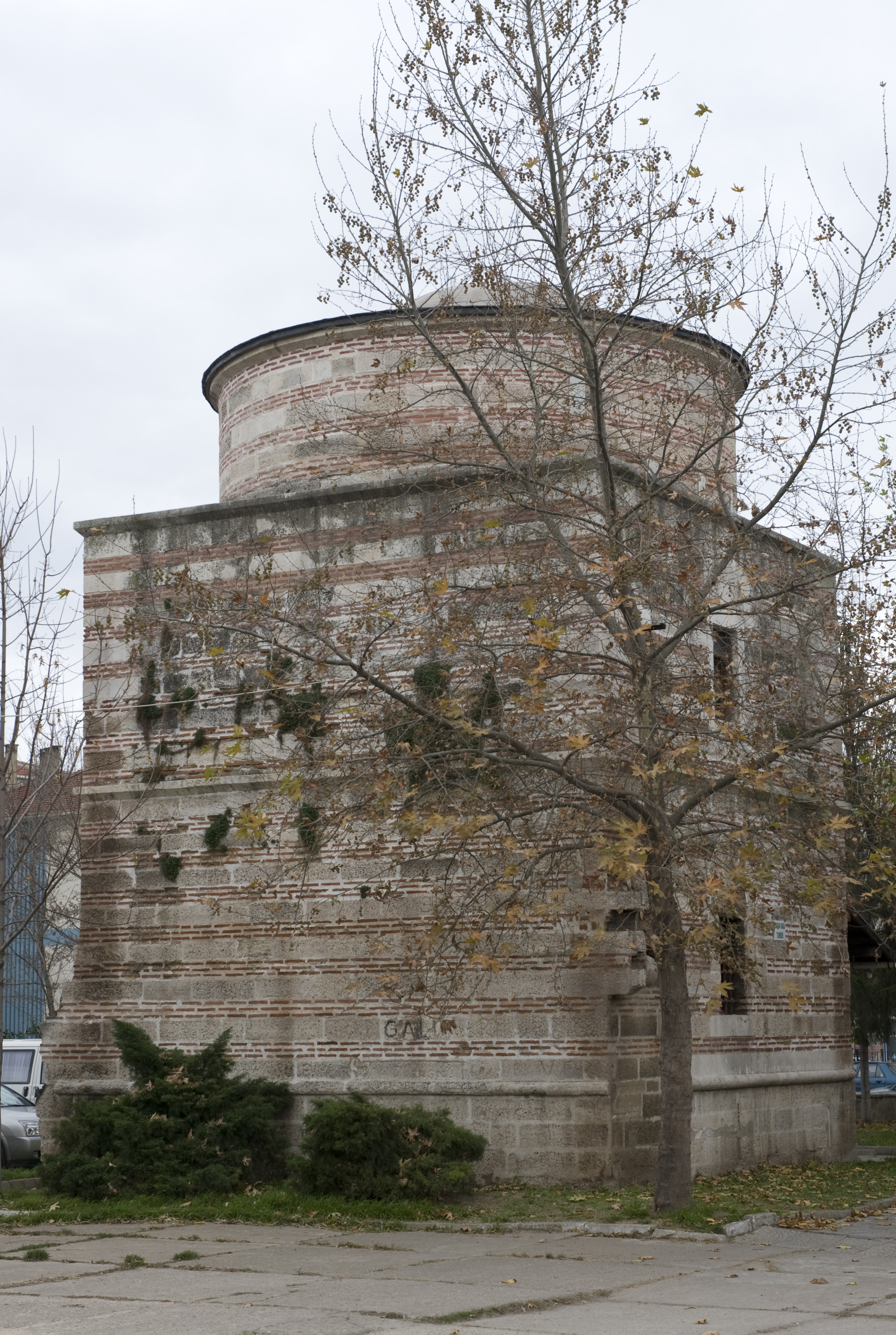
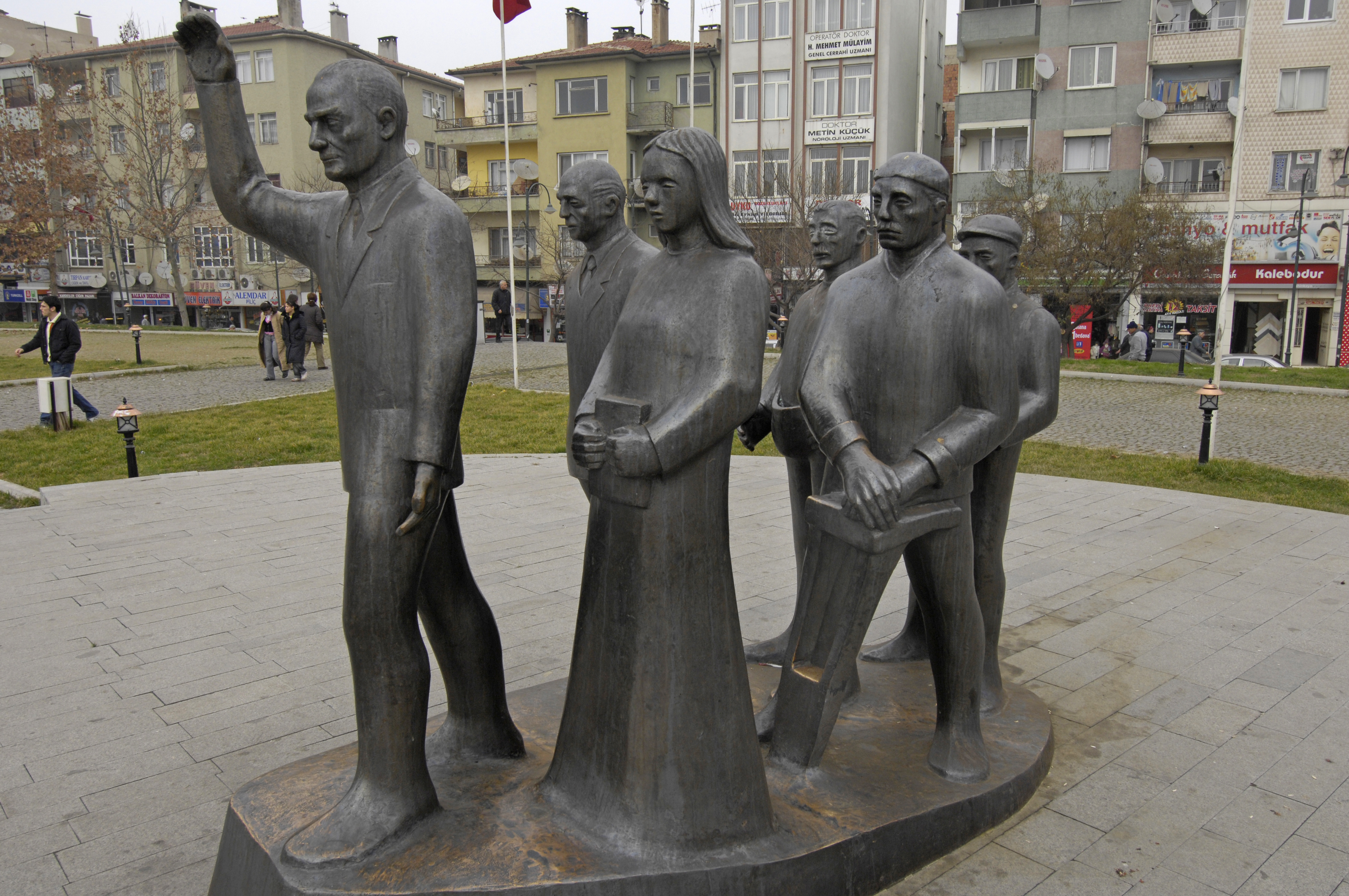
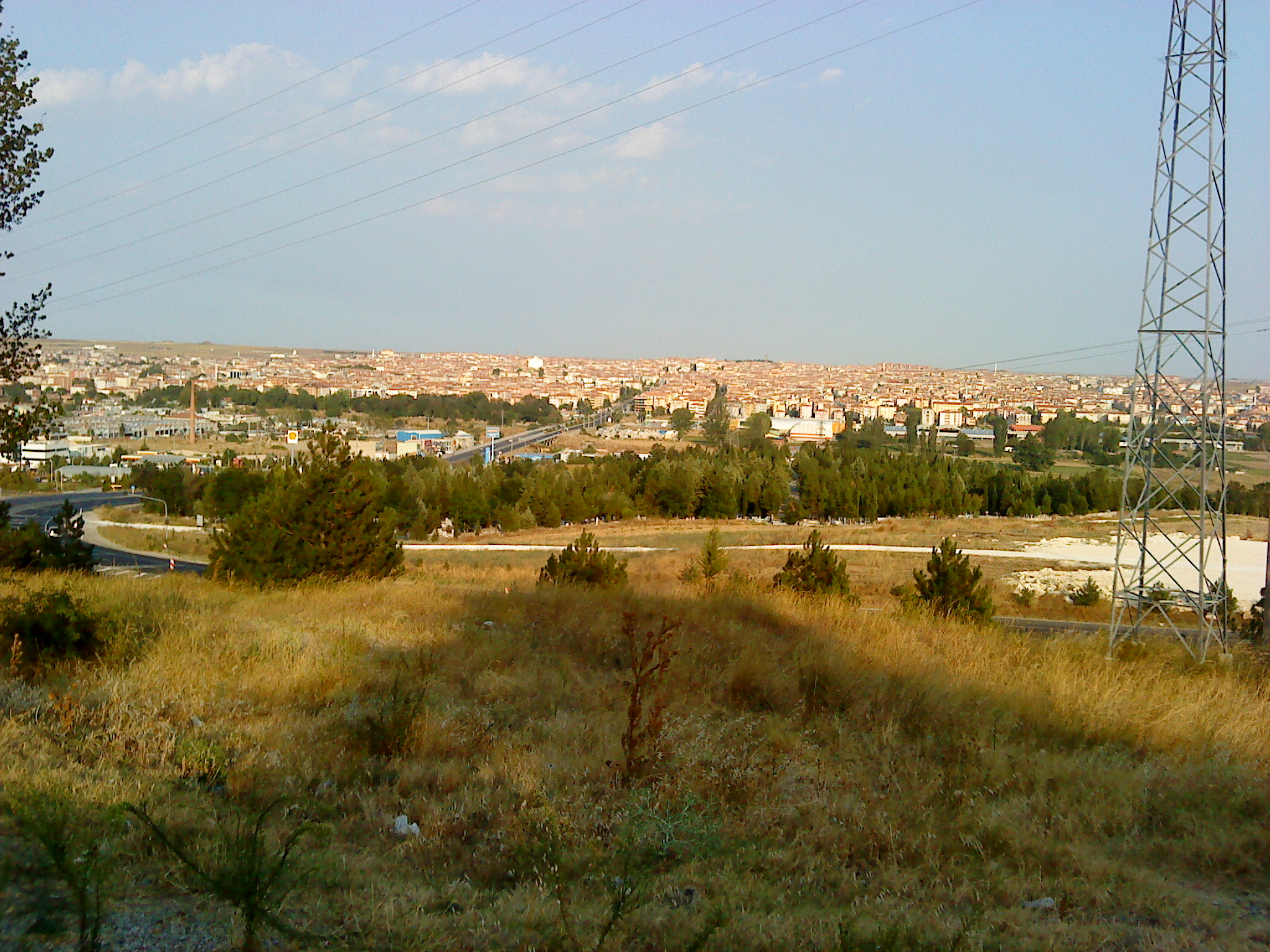
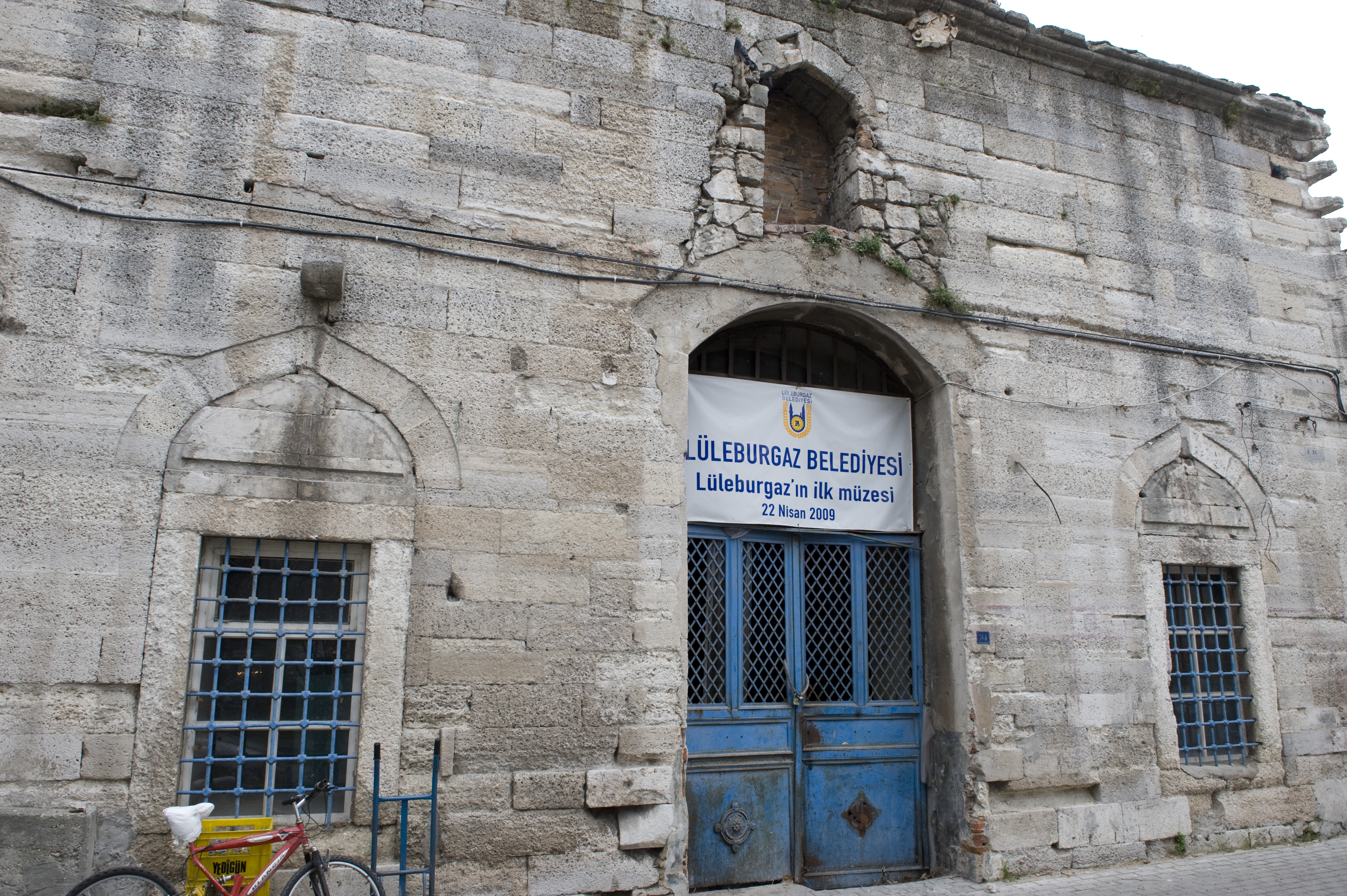
- From top left: Mehmet Pasha Sokolović Mosque; Mehmet Pasha Sokolović bridge; Lüleburgaz railway station; Zindan Baba Türbesi; Congress Square; Panorama of Lüleburgaz; Lüleburgaz museum

- Logo

- Location within Turkey Location within Marmara
- Coordinates: 41°24′20″N 27°21′25″E
- Country: Turkey
- Province: Kırklareli
- District: Lüleburgaz

Government
  - Mayor: Murat Gerenli (CHP)
- Elevation: 60 m (200 ft)
- Population (2022): 125,404
- Time zone: UTC+3 (TRT)
- Postal code: 39750
- Area code: 0288
- Climate: Csa
- Website: www.luleburgaz.bel.tr

Lüleburgaz (Turkish: [lyˈlebuɾɡaz]; Modern Greek: Λουλέ Μπουργκάς Lule Burgas; Bulgarian: Люлебургаз Lyuleburgaz), Bergoule (Ancient Greek: Βεργούλη), Arcadiopolis (Ancient Greek: Ἀρκαδιούπολις Arkadiópolis) or colloquially referred as Burgaz is the largest city of Kırklareli Province in the Marmara region of Turkey. It is the seat of Lüleburgaz District. Its population is 125,404 (2022). Located near the border with Bulgaria and Greece within the historic region of East Thrace in Rumelia, the city is home to many Balkan Turks from Albania, Bulgaria, Greece, Romania and ex-Yugoslavia who immigrated to Turkey since the 19th century.

Lüleburgaz is a hub for road and rail transportation, with the city being connected to Istanbul and Edirne by the Istanbul-Kapıkule Regional Train and to Plovdiv, Sofia, Belgrade, Bucharest and Budapest by the Bosphorus Express and the Istanbul-Sofia Express.

Its best known attraction is the 16th-century Sokollu Mehmed Pasha Mosque, named after the Grand Vizier Mehmet Paşa Sokolović and designed by the Ottoman chief architect Mimar Sinan who also designed a bridge for the city.

== History ==
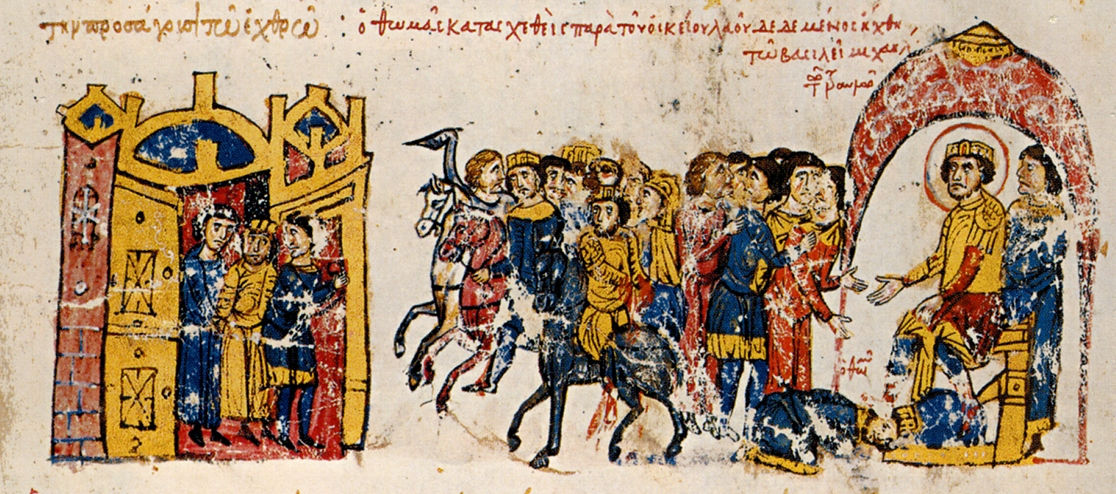
The surrender and humiliation of Thomas the Slav in the Skylitzes manuscript.

The city used to be the capital of the Roman province of Europa, established by the Roman Emperor Diocletian in 294.

The city's ancient name was Bergula but Emperor Theodosius I changed it to Arcadiopolis in honour of his son and successor Arcadius. The city of Arcadiopolis fell to Attila the Hun during his campaign against the Eastern Roman Empire in 443 AD.

In 823, Thomas the Slav was besieged in Arcadiopolis as his revolt against Michael II fell apart. After more than five months of confinement, Thomas's exhausted and starving troops gave up their leader in exchange for an imperial pardon. Thomas was led out of the city gates on a donkey and handed over to Michael for torture and execution.

The Battle of Arcadiopolis of 970 saw the Byzantine forces defeat an invading Kievan-Pecheneg-Magyar force who were aiming to capture Constantinople, 100 miles (161 kilometres) to the east.

As the capital of the Roman province of Europa, Acradiopolis had its own bishop, who was recorded as attending a number of important church councils; it was noted as an autocephalous archbishopric by the seventh century. It is no longer a residential bishopric, although the Diocese of Arcadiopolis survives as a Roman Catholic titular see. Marcel Lefebvre, the founder of the Society of Saint Pius X, was one of its titular bishops.

Lüleburgaz came under Ottoman control during the early period of the Ottoman Empire's enlargement to the Balkans.

The Battle of Lüleburgaz was fought between 28 October and 2 November 1912 during the First Balkan War. The city was occupied by the Greek army between 1920 and 1922, before becoming part of the Modern Turkish Republic.

== Impact of the 1989 Bulgarian Migration ==
After the mass migration of ethnic Turks from Bulgaria in 1989, Lüleburgaz, located in the Thrace region of northwestern Turkey, experienced significant demographic and socio-economic changes. The migration took place after the Bulgarian government introduced assimilation policies toward the Turkish minority, which led to the departure of more than 300,000 people within a short period. Due to its geographical proximity to the Bulgarian border and its developed agricultural areas, Lüleburgaz became one of the important settlement centers for the arriving migrants.

The arrival of Bulgarian Turks contributed to a noticeable population increase in Lüleburgaz during the late 1980s and early 1990s. Many of the newcomers had previous experience in agriculture, animal husbandry, and skilled trades such as construction, mechanics, and small-scale manufacturing. Their participation in local farming activities, especially sunflower and wheat production, as well as their involvement in workshops and small businesses, supported economic growth and increased productivity in the district.

The migration also influenced the social and cultural structure of Lüleburgaz. The newcomers established neighborhoods, associations, and social networks that helped them adapt to their new environment. At the same time, they preserved elements of Balkan cultural heritage, including traditional music, cuisine, and community celebrations, which became part of the city’s cultural diversity over time.

== Climate ==
Lüleburgaz has a transitional hot-summer Mediterranean climate/humid subtropical climate (Köppen: Csa/Cfa), with hot, moderately dry summers, and chilly, rainy, occasionally snowy winters.

Climate data for Lüleburgaz (1991–2020)
Month	Jan	Feb	Mar	Apr	May	Jun	Jul	Aug	Sep	Oct	Nov	Dec	Year
Mean daily maximum °C (°F)	8.5 (47.3)	10.6 (51.1)	14.1 (57.4)	19.6 (67.3)	25.4 (77.7)	30.3 (86.5)	32.8 (91.0)	33.0 (91.4)	28.1 (82.6)	21.8 (71.2)	15.4 (59.7)	9.9 (49.8)	20.8 (69.4)
Daily mean °C (°F)	3.6 (38.5)	5.0 (41.0)	7.8 (46.0)	12.2 (54.0)	17.5 (63.5)	22.2 (72.0)	24.5 (76.1)	24.5 (76.1)	20.0 (68.0)	14.8 (58.6)	9.5 (49.1)	5.1 (41.2)	14.0 (57.2)
Mean daily minimum °C (°F)	−0.3 (31.5)	0.4 (32.7)	2.4 (36.3)	5.5 (41.9)	10.0 (50.0)	14.1 (57.4)	15.9 (60.6)	16.0 (60.8)	12.4 (54.3)	8.7 (47.7)	4.5 (40.1)	1.1 (34.0)	7.6 (45.7)
Average precipitation mm (inches)	54.98 (2.16)	55.25 (2.18)	55.89 (2.20)	39.76 (1.57)	46.71 (1.84)	44.19 (1.74)	33.94 (1.34)	12.21 (0.48)	36.09 (1.42)	65.62 (2.58)	55.69 (2.19)	73.18 (2.88)	573.51 (22.58)
Average precipitation days (≥ 1.0 mm)	7.0	6.0	6.7	5.8	6.1	5.3	3.4	2.5	4.1	5.1	5.6	7.4	65.0
Average relative humidity (%)	79.7	76.1	73.3	69.2	66.1	62.6	59.6	59.0	63.7	71.4	77.3	80.0	69.6
Source: NOAA

== Economy ==
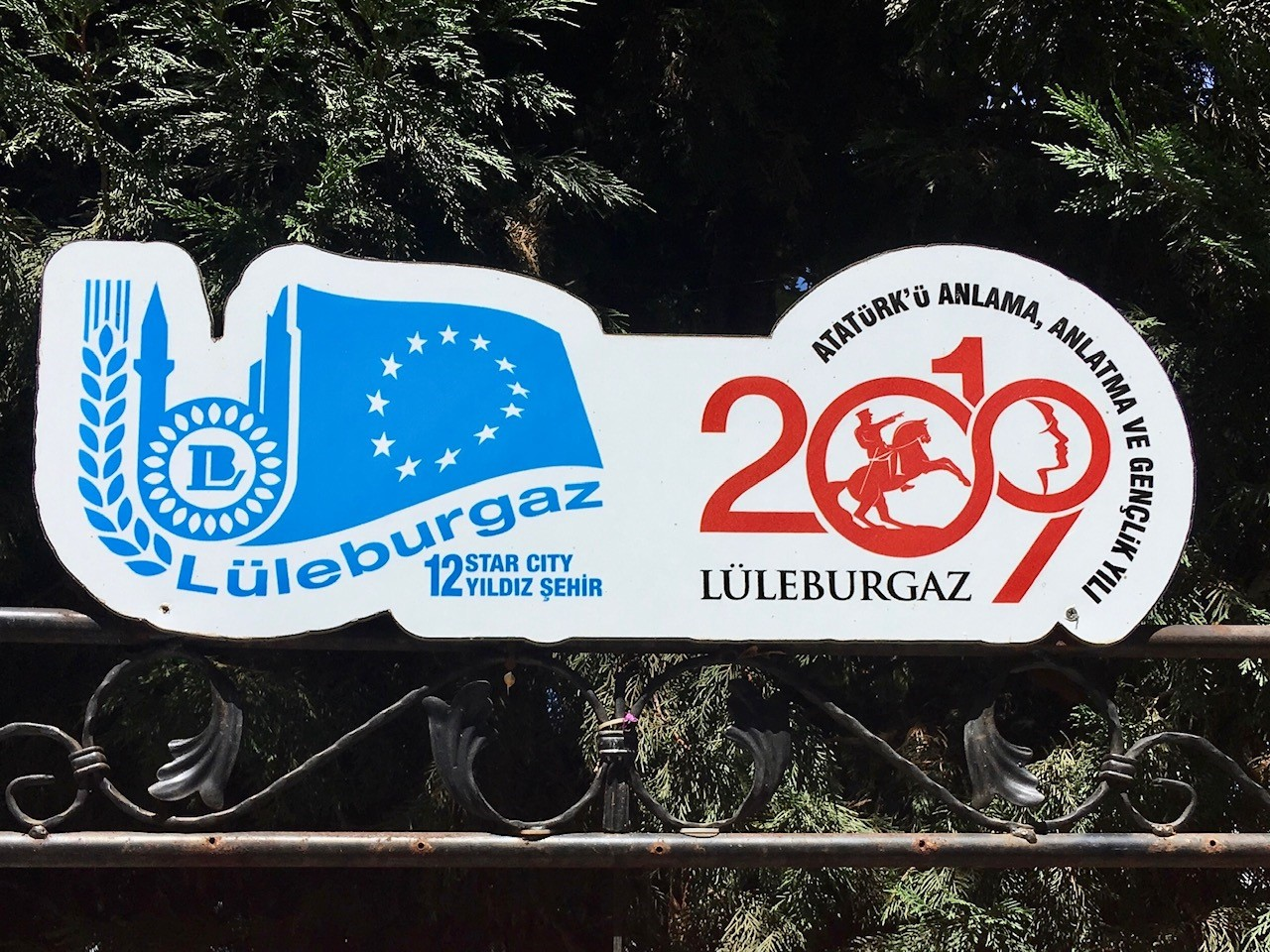
Coat of arms of the city of Lüleburgaz in 2019. It displays the Mehmet Pasha Sokolović Mosque (left) and factory chimneys (right), as well as a sunflower and wheat ears with the initials of the city and a European Union (EU) flag.

The economy of Lüleburgaz is mainly based on the industrial sector and agriculture. There are various factories around the city.

=== Pharmaceutical industry ===
Pharmaceutical companies such as Sanofi-Aventis, Deva Holding A.S. and Zentiva have their main manufacturers within the urban area of Lüleburgaz.

=== Agriculture ===
Crops widely grown around Lüleburgaz include wheat, corn and sunflowers, with the latter being one of the symbols of the city. Trakya Birlik, with its headquarters in the city, is one of Turkey's main sunflower oil producers.

=== Glass production ===
Şişecam, Turkey's leading glass producer, has a factory in Lüleburgaz, as does its East Thracian division Trakya Cam (Thrace Glass).

== Sport ==
Founded in 2007, the women's football club, Düvenciler Lisesispor, played in the Turkish Women's First Football League after promotion from the Second League. In 2011 the team changed its name to Lüleburgaz 39 Spor and its colours from yellow-black to red-green. The club ended its participation in the league in the 2013-14 season.

== Culture ==
The city and the Battle of Lüleburgas feature in Marcel Proust's Time Regained, the final chapter of Remembrance of Things Past, published in 1927.

The festival of koliada is historically celebrated in the city in the month of January.

== Media companies ==
The city of Lüleburgaz is home to several local media agencies including the centre-left Lüleburgaz Görünüm Gazetesi and Lüleburgaz Haber.

== Politics ==
Lüleburgaz is one of the most pro-European cities of Turkey; mayoral candidates advocating tighter integration with the European Union dominate during elections.

Historically, the centre-left, secular and pro-European Republican People's Party (CHP) has dominated city politics. In the 2017 Turkish constitutional referendum, 72.89% of the population of Lüleburgaz voted "no". In the 2018 Turkish general election the most popular party was the CHP which received 51.38% of the vote. The liberal democratic Nation Alliance received 64.80% of the votes in the city. In the 2019 Turkish local elections the most popular candidate was Murat Gerenli of the CHP which received 66.55% of the vote.

== Famous residents ==
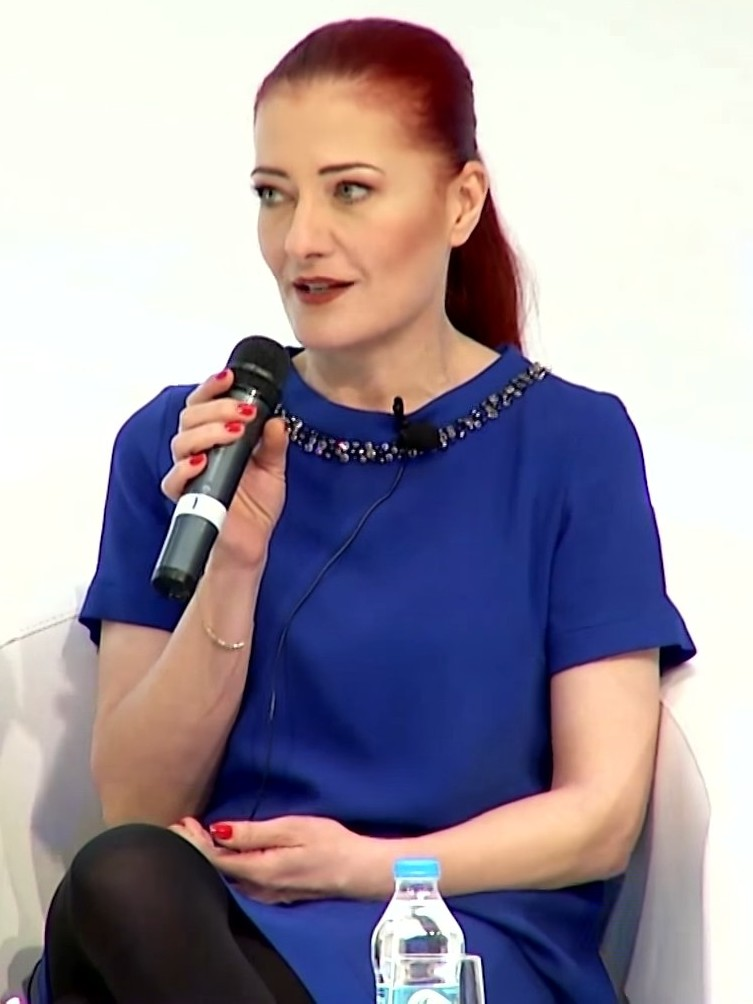
Turkish singer-songwriter Candan Erçetin, 2015

- Ahmet Özacar, Turkish footballer
- Candan Erçetin, Turkish singer-songwriter of Kosovar-Macedonian descent that represented Turkey in the Eurovision Song Contest 1986, recipient of the Ordre des Arts et des Lettres for her contributions to France–Turkey relations

== Twin towns – sister cities ==
Lüleburgaz is twinned with:

- (Bulgaria) Silistra
- (Bulgaria) Popovo

== See also ==
- Battle of Lule Burgas
- Bergule
- Europa
- Rumelia

== Bibliography ==
- Bergulae Dictionary of Greek and Roman Geography
- Arcadiopolis founded by Arcadius
