= Floch =

Floc'h, Floch, ar Floc'h and ar Floc'hig (frenchized in Le Floc'h, Le Floc'hic or even Le Page and Lécuyer) is a Breton family name meaning « the page ». It can refer to:

- Anthony Floch (born 1983), French rugby union player
- Henri Le Floch (1862–1950), French priest
- Jean-Claude Floch (born 1953), French illustrator, known as Floc'h
- Louis Floch (born 1947), French footballer
- Xavier Le Floch, French triathlete
- Loïk Le Floch-Prigent (born in 1943), French engineer

== Miscellaneous ==
- Floch Forster, a fictional character in the anime/manga series Attack on Titan
- 145445 Le Floch, an asteroid
