= Narco (Thrace) =

Settlement of ancient Thrace

Coordinates: 41°20′47″N 27°28′09″E

Narco was a settlement and station (mutatio) of ancient Thrace, inhabited during Byzantine times.

Its site is located east of Bergule in European Turkey.
