= Urisio =

Settlement and station (mutatio) of ancient Thrace

Coordinates: 41°25′09″N 27°14′17″E

Urisio was a settlement and station (mutatio) of ancient Thrace, inhabited during Byzantine times.

Its site is located west of Bergule in European Turkey.
