= Diocese of Arcadiopolis =

Diocese in East Thrace (5 century - 14 century)

The Diocese of Arcadiopolis (modern Lüleburgaz in East Thrace) was an ecclesiastical diocese established in the fifth century and extant until the fourteenth century.

The see is first mentioned in the Council of Ephesus in 431, when Bishop Euprepius held the joint episcopacy of Bizye and Arcadiopolis. The same arrangement is attested in the Council of Chalcedon in 451. The two cities probably did not become separate bishoprics until the end of the century. Arcadiopolis was originally a suffragan bishop of Heraclea in Europa, metropolitan see and capital of the Roman province of Europa, but became an autocephalous archbishopric by the late ninth century, and eventually a metropolitan see probably during the reign of Isaac II Angelos (r. 1185–95). Of its bishops, Lucianus was at the Council of Chalcedon (451), Sabbatius at the Second Council of Constantinople (553), John at the Second Council of Nicaea (787), and Basil at the 879 Photian Fourth Council of Constantinople. Bishop Peter is known from his seal dated to the 9th/10th centuries, and an archbishop John signed the decree against the Jacobites in 1032.

Following the Fourth Crusade, and for the duration of Latin rule, a Roman Catholic episcopal see (Archadopolitanum) was erected alongside the existing Greek Orthodox metropolis, as a suffragan of the Catholic Archbishop of Heraclea. The see declined quickly thereafter: under Andronikos II Palaiologos (r. 1282–1328) the metropolis fell to 101st place, rising to 86th under Andronikos III Palaiologos (r. 1328–41). A metropolitan Malachias is attested in April 1329, but following the town's conquest by the Ottoman Turks later in the century the see fell vacant and was abandoned.

Arcadiopolis is still listed by the Catholic Church as a titular see. Marcel Lefebvre, the founder of the Society of Saint Pius X, was one of its titular bishops.
