= Joseph-Charles Lefèbvre =

His Eminence Joseph-Charles Lefèbvre
- Archbishop Emeritus of Bourges
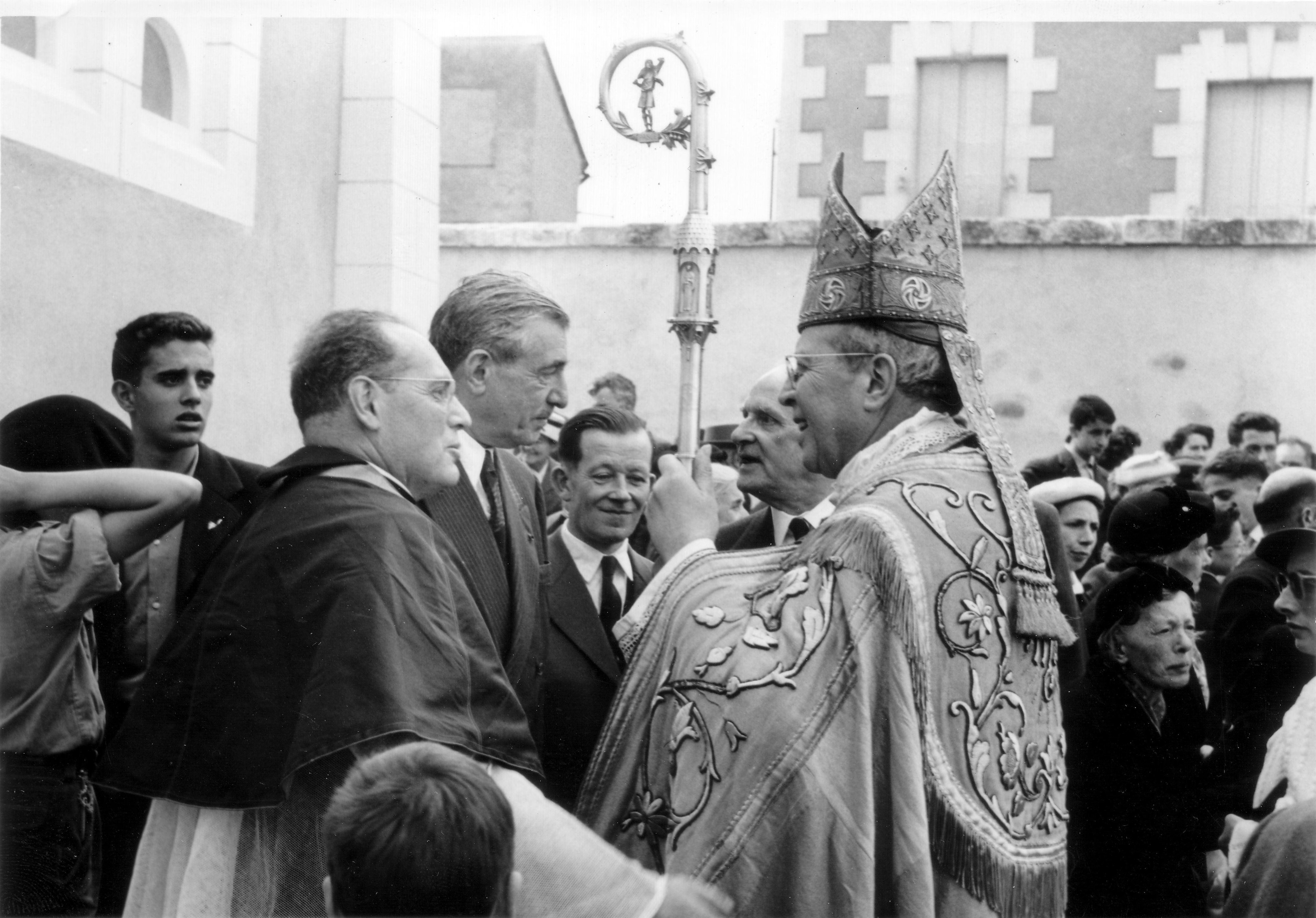
- Lefèbvre present in 1959 for the funeral of the duke of Talleyrand-Périgord.
- Church: Roman Catholic Church
- Archdiocese: Bourges
- See: Bourges
- Appointed: 17 June 1943
- Term ended: 10 October 1969
- Predecessor: Louis-Joseph Fillon
- Successor: Charles-Marie-Paul Vignancour
- Other post: Cardinal-Priest of San Giovanni Battista dei Fiorentini (1960-73)
- Previous post: Bishop of Troyes (1938-43)

Orders
- Ordination: 17 December 1921
- Consecration: 11 October 1938 by Édouard Gabriel Mesguen
- Created cardinal: 28 March 1960 by Pope John XXIII
- Rank: Cardinal-Priest

Personal details
- Born: Joseph-Charles Lefèbvre; 15 April 1892 Tourcoing, Hauts-de-France, French Third Republic
- Died: 2 April 1973 (aged 80) Bourges, France
- Buried: Bourges Cathedral
- Parents: Georges Jules Joseph Lefébvre; Marie Agnès Lucie Joseph Decaestecker
- Education: Université catholique de Lille; Pontifical Gregorian University; Pontifical French Seminary
- Motto: Veritatem facientes in caritate
- Coat of arms

Styles of Joseph-Charles Lefèbvre
- Reference style: His Eminence
- Spoken style: Your Eminence
- Informal style: Cardinal
- See: Bourges

Joseph-Charles Lefèbvre (commonly Joseph Lefèbvre, 15 April 1892—2 April 1973) was a French cardinal of the Roman Catholic Church. He served as Archbishop of Bourges from 1943 to 1969 and was made a cardinal in 1960.

He was the cousin of Archbishop Marcel Lefebvre and the nephew of monarchist and resistance hero René Lefebvre.

== Biography ==
Joseph-Charles Lefèbvre was born in Tourcoing on 12 April 1892. He studied law at the Catholic University of Lille, but interrupted his studies for family reasons. He became president of a Catholic youth group and decided to become a priest, but first served in the French Army during World War I. He was severely wounded in 1914 near Mariembourg and taken prisoner. He was released in a prisoner exchange in 1918 and left military service in 1919. He studied at the Pontifical Gregorian University, the Pontifical French Seminary in Rome, and the University of Fribourg. At the Gregorian, he received a gold medal for his exceptional grades.

Lefèbvre was ordained a priest on 17 December 1921. In 1924 he began pastoral work in Poitiers, where he became Director of Works, honorary canon, and vicar general. He was raised to the rank of monsignor on 28 December 1936.

On 27 July 1938, Lefèbvre was appointed bishop of Troyes by Pope Pius XI. He received his episcopal consecration on 11 October from Bishop Edouard-Gabriel Mesguen, with Bishops Joseph-Jean Heintz and Louis Liagre as co-consecrators. During the German occupation, he directed Troyes' medical services and provisioning. Lefebvre was promoted to archbishop of Bourges on 17 June 1943. In the 1950s, in order to counter the increasingly popular French view that the Church is allied with the wealthy against the working class, Lefèbvre suggested to "throw light on the essential teachings of the Church in contemporary affairs—political, social and economic".

Pope John XXIII, who came to like the "tall, jolly" Lefèbvre while serving as nuncio to France, created him cardinal priest of San Giovanni dei Fiorentini in the consistory of 28 March 1960. He participated as a cardinal elector in the 1963 papal conclave that elected Pope Paul VI, where he and his French peers were thought to be enthusiastic in supporting his election. Pope Paul made him a member of the Holy Office in 1964 as part of his campaign to make its leadership less Italian and less curial.

Lefèbvre attended all four sessions of the Second Vatican Council (1962–1965). At the final session, on 20 September 1965, he joined in defending the proposed document on religious freedom, eventually promulgated as Dignitatis humanae. He made "a powerful impression" with a detailed refutation of the opponents' arguments. Though thought to oppose any liberalization of the Church's policy on contraception, in 1966 he surprised his peers on the Pontifical Commission on Birth Control by saying that "it would not be too rash" to approve of artificial birth control as a deeper understanding of traditional teaching.

He served a four-year term as president of the French Episcopal Conference from 1965 to 1969. From 1965 to 1969, he was cardinals' representative to that body. Lefèbvre resigned his position in Bourges on 10 October 1969, citing his age. He died there on 2 April 1973 at the age of 80. He was buried in the Cathedral of Saint-Étienne.

A small park in Bourges in named for him, as is a street in Troyes.

Catholic Church titles
Preceded by Joseph-Jean Heintz	Bishop of Troyes; 1938–1943	Succeeded by Julien Le Couëdic
Preceded by Louis-Joseph Fillon	Archbishop of Bourges; 1943–1969	Succeeded by Charles-Marie-Paul Vignancour
Preceded by new title	Cardinal Priest of San Giovanni dei Fiorentini; 1960–1973	Succeeded by Juan Carlos Aramburu
