= Hexamilium =

Hexamilium was a Roman and Byzantine-era bishopric possibly centered on Lysimachia, on the Gallipoli Peninsula in modern Turkey.

It was located in the Roman province of Europa. and was mentioned by Ammianus Marcellinus and was known in the Late Roman Empire.

No bishops are known. It remains a vacant and titular see of the Roman Catholic Church.
