= Marcel Lefebvre =

French traditionalist Catholic archbishop (1905–1991)

- Superior General of the Society of Saint Pius X
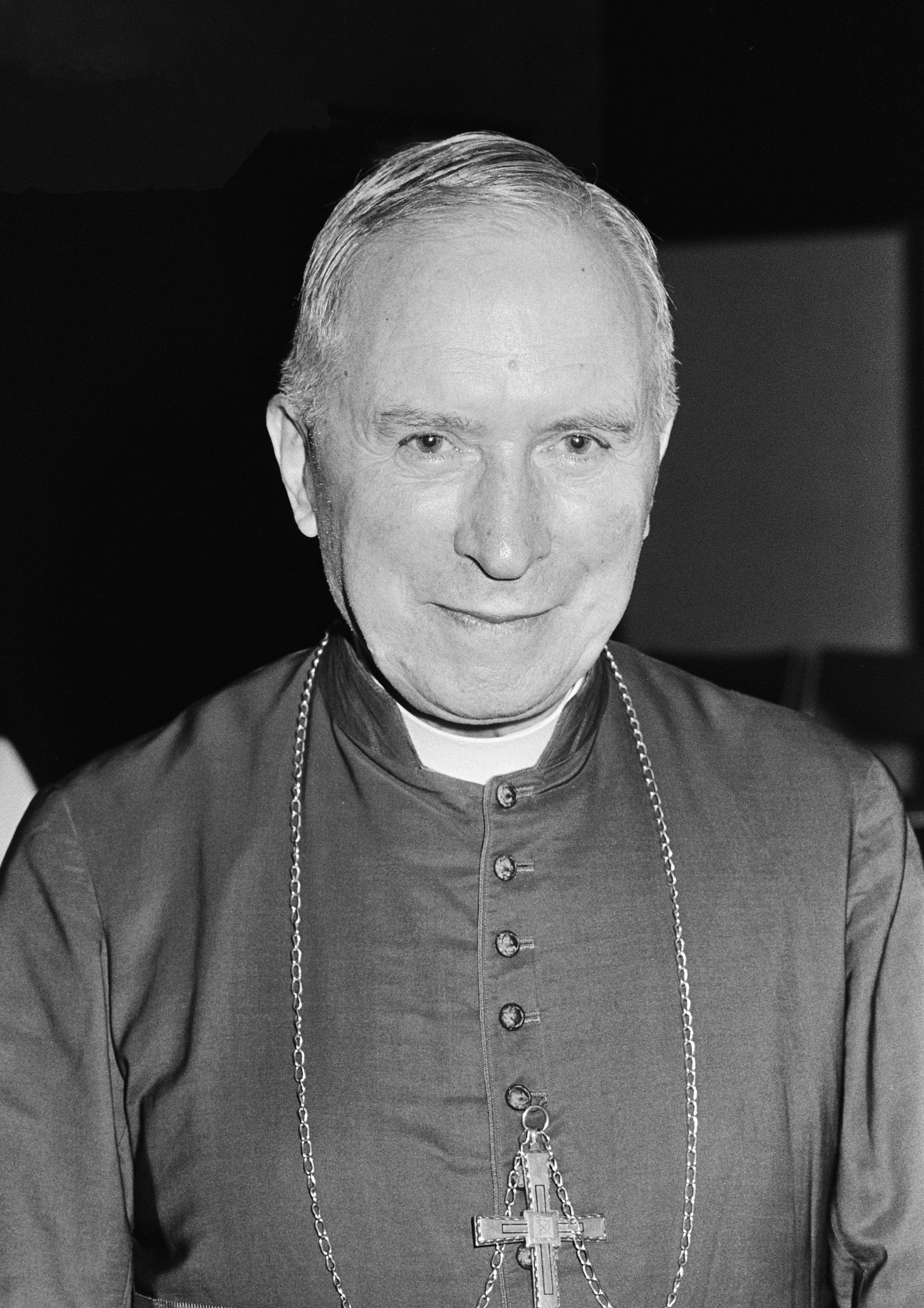
- Lefebvre in 1981
- Appointed: 1 November 1970
- Term ended: 16 September 1982
- Successor: Franz Schmidberger
- Previous posts: Vicar Apostolic of Dakar (1947–1955); Titular Bishop of Anthedon (1947–1948); Apostolic Administrator of Saint-Louis du Sénégal (1948–1955); Titular Archbishop of Arcadiopolis in Europa (1948–1955); Apostolic Delegate to Dakar (1948–1959); Archbishop of Dakar (1955–1962); Bishop of Tulle (1962); Founder and Superior General of the Society of Saint Pius X (1970–1982); Superior General of the Congregation of the Holy Ghost (1962–1968); Titular Archbishop of Synnada in Phrygia (1962–1970)

Orders
- Ordination: 21 September 1929 by Achille Liénart
- Consecration: 18 September 1947 by Achille Liénart

Personal details
- Born: Marcel-François Marie Joseph Lefebvre; 29 November 1905 Tourcoing, French Third Republic
- Died: 25 March 1991 (aged 85) Martigny, Valais, Switzerland
- Buried: International Seminary of Saint Pius X, Écône, Switzerland
- Parents: René Lefebvre (father); Gabrielle Watine (mother)
- Education: Pontifical French Seminary
- Motto: Et nos credidimus caritati (And we believed in charity)

Ordination history
History
Priestly ordination
- Ordained by: Achille Liénart
- Date: 21 September 1929
Episcopal consecration
- Principal consecrator: Achille Liénart
- Co-consecrators: Alfred-Jean-Félix Ancel, Jean-Baptiste Victor Fauret
- Date: 18 September 1947
Episcopal succession
Bishops consecrated by Marcel Lefebvre as principal consecrator
- Georges-Henri Guibert: 19 February 1950
- Prosper Dodds: 26 October 1952
- François Ndong: 2 July 1961
- Bernard Tissier de Mallerais: 30 June 1988
- Richard Williamson: 30 June 1988
- Alfonso de Galarreta: 30 June 1988
- Bernard Fellay: 30 June 1988
- Styles
- Reference style: His Excellency
- Spoken style: Your Excellency

Marcel François Marie Joseph Lefebvre (Note: French: [maʁsɛl fʁɑ̃swa maʁi ʒozɛf ləfɛvʁ]) (29 November 1905 – 25 March 1991) was a French Catholic prelate who served as Archbishop of Dakar from 1955 to 1962. He was a major influence in modern traditionalist Catholicism, founding in 1970 the Society of Saint Pius X (SSPX) to train traditionalist seminarians. In 1988, Pope John Paul II declared that Lefebvre had been automatically excommunicated for consecrating four bishops that year without permission and despite the pope's express prohibition.

Lefebvre was born in Tourcoing. Ordained a diocesan priest in 1929, Lefebvre joined the Holy Ghost Fathers for missionary work and was assigned to teach at a seminary in Gabon in 1932. In 1947, he was appointed Vicar Apostolic of Dakar, and the next year as the apostolic nuncio to French West Africa. Upon his return to Europe, Lefebvre was elected superior general of the Holy Ghost Fathers and assigned to draft and prepare documents for the Second Vatican Council. A major leader of the conservative bloc during its proceedings, Lefebvre took the lead in opposing the council's changes, especially with regard to ecumenism. He refused to implement council-inspired reforms demanded by the Holy Ghost Fathers and resigned from the order in 1968.

In 1970, Lefebvre founded the SSPX as a small community of seminarians in the village of Écône, Switzerland, with the permission of the local bishop. In 1975, after a flare-up of tensions with the Holy See, Lefebvre was ordered to disband the society, but ignored the decision and continued to maintain its activities and existence. In 1988, against the express prohibition of Pope John Paul II, he consecrated four bishops to continue his work with the SSPX. The Holy See immediately declared that all parties in the ceremony had incurred automatic excommunication, (Note: Code of Canon Law 1983, Canon 1382: "A bishop who consecrates someone a bishop without a pontifical mandate and the person who receives the consecration from him incur a latae sententiae excommunication reserved to the Apostolic See") which Lefebvre refused to acknowledge. The excommunications were rescinded in 2009 by Pope Benedict XVI, though the SSPX itself remained "canonically irregular." As of July 2026, following the consecration of four new bishops, the Holy See again declared that all parties involved in the new consecration incurred an automatic excommunication, along with the sacred ministers of the SSPX. Additionally, and unlike in 1988, the 2026 excommunication also included some of the laity, albeit only those who "formally adhere" to the SSPX.

== Early life and family ==
Marcel François Marie Joseph Lefebvre was born in Tourcoing, Nord, on 29 November 1905. He was the second son and third child of eight children of textile factory-owner René Lefebvre and Gabrielle, born Watine, who died in 1938.

His parents were devout Catholics who brought their children to daily Mass. His father, René, was an outspoken monarchist, devoting his life to the cause of the Bourbon Dynasty, seeing in a monarchy the only way of restoring to his country its past grandeur and a Christian revival.

His father ran a spy ring for British Intelligence when Tourcoing was occupied by the Germans during World War I. René died at the Sonnenburg concentration camp aged 65 in 1944, having been sentenced to death one year before.

== Priest ==
In 1923, Lefebvre began studies for the priesthood; at the insistence of his father, he followed his brother to the Pontifical French Seminary in Rome, as his father suspected the diocesan seminaries of liberal leanings. He later credited his conservative views to the rector, a Breton priest named Father Henri Le Floch. He interrupted his studies in 1926 and 1927 to perform his military service. On 25 May 1929 he was ordained deacon by Cardinal Basilio Pompili in the Basilica of St. John Lateran in Rome. On 21 September 1929 he was ordained a priest of the Diocese of Lille by its bishop, Achille Liénart. After ordination, he continued his studies in Rome, completing a doctorate in theology in July 1930.

Lefebvre asked to be allowed to perform missionary work as a member of the Holy Ghost Fathers, but in August 1930 Liénart required him to first work as assistant curate in a parish in Lomme, a suburb of Lille. Liénart released him from the diocese in July 1931 and Lefebvre entered the novitiate of the Holy Ghost Fathers at Orly in September. On 8 September 1932, he took simple vows for a period of three years.

Lefebvre's first assignment as a Holy Ghost Father was as a professor at St. John's Seminary in Libreville, Gabon. In 1934 he was made rector of the seminary. On 28 September 1935 he made his perpetual vows. He served as superior of a number of missions of the Holy Ghost Fathers in Gabon. (Note: St. Michel de Ndjolé (May 1938 – August 1939), Ste. Marie de Libreville (December 1939 – August 1940), St. Paul de Donguila (August 1940 – April 1943), and finally St. François Xavier de Lambaréné (April 1943 – October 1945)) In October 1945, Lefebvre returned to France to become rector of the Holy Ghost Fathers seminary in Mortain.

== Bishop in Africa ==
Lefebvre in Senegal having fun with local kids

On 12 June 1947, Pope Pius XII appointed him Vicar Apostolic of Dakar in Senegal and titular bishop of Anthedon. On 18 September 1947 he was consecrated a bishop in his family's parish church in Tourcoing by Liénart, now a cardinal, with Bishops Jean-Baptiste Fauret and Alfred-Jean-Félix Ancel as co-consecrators. In his new position Lefebvre was responsible for an area with a population of three and a half million people, of whom only 50,000 were Catholics.

On 22 September 1948, Lefebvre, while continuing as Vicar Apostolic of Dakar, received the additional responsibilities of Apostolic Delegate to Dakar in French West Africa, with his title changed to titular archbishop of Arcadiopolis in Europa. He became responsible for representing the interests of the Holy See to Church authorities in 46 dioceses in "continental and insular Africa subject to the French Government, with the addition of the Diocese of Reunion, the whole of the island of Madagascar and the other neighbouring islands under French rule, but excluding the dioceses of North Africa, namely those of Carthage, Constantine, Algiers and Oran." (Note: That is, all French Africa – including two départments of today's France proper, Réunion and Mayotte – with the exception of Tunisia and mainland Algeria (the latter then considered part of France proper), but not excluding the Algerian southern territories.)

In the late 1940s, Lefebvre established a ministry in Paris to care for Catholic students from the French colonies in Africa. He and other missionaries in Africa thought young Africans would otherwise be attracted to radical ideologies, including anti-colonialism and atheism. This idea of "safeguarding the Catholicism of the emerging African elite" was later adopted by Pope Pius in his encyclical on the missions, Fidei donum (1957).

Lefebvre's chief duty was the building up of the ecclesiastical structure in French Africa. Pope Pius XII wanted to move quickly towards an ecclesiastical structure with dioceses instead of vicariates and apostolic prefectures. Lefebvre was responsible for selecting these new bishops, increasing the number of priests and religious sisters, as well as the number of churches in the various dioceses. On 14 September 1955, Pope Pius decreed a complete reorganization of the ecclesiastical jurisdictions in French Africa. The Apostolic Vicariate of Dakar was made an archdiocese, and Lefebvre became its first archbishop.

== Transition years, 1959–1962 ==
Lefebvre's career shifted rapidly with the death of Pope Pius XII, moving from the missions to Rome, though not directly, and with indications that he was at times favoured and at times disfavoured by the new pope. Pope John XXIII replaced Lefebvre as Apostolic Delegate to Dakar on 9 July 1959, a position that would quickly evolve as the colonies gained their independence in the 1960s. The next year, Pope John appointed Lefebvre to the 120-member Central Preparatory Commission for the Second Vatican Council.

After Senegal declared its independence in June 1960, its first president, Léopold Sédar Senghor proposed the country adopt its own form of socialism, which he, as a Catholic, believed compatible with Church doctrine. Lefebvre, still Archbishop of Dakar, criticized Senghor's views in a March 1961 pastoral letter and then in a personal audience with Senghor, drawing on Pope Pius XI's denunciation of socialism in his 1931 encyclical Quadragesimo anno. Now at odds with the government, Lefebvre watched as the Holy See replaced European missionary bishops with Africans and tried to delay his own removal by asking for the appointment of a coadjutor, which met with no response. (Note: Lefebvre's successor in Dakar was Hyacinthe Thiandoum, who was made a cardinal in 1976 at the consistory where Pope Paul decried Lefebvre's actions.) He told Pope John "the Africans are not yet ripe" and did not want to be responsible. Pope John said he took the responsibility and would see that Lefebvre was taken care of properly.

On 23 January 1962, Lefebvre was transferred to the Diocese of Tulle, one of the smallest in France, while retaining the personal title of archbishop. (Note: As bishop of Tulle, he was a suffragan to the archbishop of Bourges, his cousin Cardinal Joseph-Charles Lefèbvre (1982–1973).) On 4 April 1962, he was named a consultor to the Sacred Congregation for the Propagation of the Faith.

On 26 July 1962, the Chapter General of the Holy Ghost Fathers, dominated by those in leadership positions with fewer representatives of local communities, elected Lefebvre to a 12-year term as their Superior General. He won 53 of the 75 votes cast on the first ballot, though some delegates had "strong misgivings". This meeting also moved the order's headquarters from Paris to Rome. Upon being elected Superior General, Lefebvre resigned as bishop of Tulle; Pope John accepted his resignation on 7 August and named him titular archbishop of Synnada in Phrygia.

== Second Vatican Council ==
As a member of the Central Preparatory Commission, Lefebvre participated in drafting documents for consideration by the Council Fathers, meeting in seven sessions between June 1961 and June 1962. Within the first two weeks of the first session of the council (October to December 1962), the Council Fathers rejected all the drafts. (Note: The council rules required a two-thirds vote to approve a schema. After conservative supporters of the schemas attempted to manipulate the procedures to require a two-thirds vote to reject a schema, Pope John intervened to make a majority sufficient to reject a schema and require a new draft.)

Lefebvre and some like-minded bishops became concerned about the direction of the council's deliberations and, led by Archbishop Geraldo de Proença Sigaud of Diamantina, formed a bloc that became known as the Coetus Internationalis Patrum (CIP) or International Group of Fathers, with the aim of guaranteeing their views were part of every council discussion.

The CIP was especially concerned about the principle of religious liberty. During the council's third session (September to November 1964), Archbishop Pericle Felici, the secretary of the council and a prominent Curial conservative, announced that Lefebvre, with two other like-minded bishops, was appointed to a special four-member commission charged with rewriting the draft document on the topic, but it was soon discovered that this measure did not have papal approval, and major responsibility for preparing the draft document was given to the Secretariat for Promoting Christian Unity.

The CIP managed to get the preliminary vote (with suggestions for modifications) on the document postponed until the fourth session of the council, where, on 7 December 1965, an overwhelming majority approved the final text of the declaration Dignitatis humanae. Lefebvre was one of the 70, about 3%, who voted against the declaration, but he added his signature to the document after that of the pope, though some withheld their signatures. (Note: Lefebvre later said that the paper that he signed did not represent his endorsement, but only recorded his presence at the meeting, but that claim is disputed.)

=== The Council and the Holy Ghost Fathers ===
At one point during the Council, some 40 bishops who were members of the Holy Ghost Fathers met with him to express their disagreement with his views and the role he was playing at the Council. He heard their views but did not engage in dialogue. His closing statement, "We all have a conscience: everyone must follow his own", left them dissatisfied. One said: "He seemed to have a blockage. He seemed incapable of reviewing his ways of thinking."

Lefebvre felt the Council's impact directly when the Holy Ghost Fathers held an Extraordinary General Chapter to respond to it. The order's leadership, though their terms had years remaining, tendered their resignations effective with the close of the meeting as was traditional. The membership had insisted on a larger role for elected delegates, and they constituted half of the body. Lefebvre's opponents were well organized, and when he tried to assume the chair, they insisted that the Chapter was a legislative body entitled to elect its own officers. On 11 September 1968 the Chapter supported that position on a vote of 63 to 40, and Lefebvre stopped attending. The Chapter then elected its leaders and proceeded with intense but respectful debate on the critical issue: the balance between the constraints of the order's religious life and the exercise of its missionary charge. Lefebvre returned on 28 September and addressed the issue in uncompromising language. He predicted any changes would lead to "a caricature of community life where anarchy, disorder, and individual initiative have free rein". His tone and arguments won him no support; the convention elected Fr. Joseph Lécuyer, a French theologian, his successor as superior general on 26 October.

== Theological and political positions ==
=== Background ===
Lefebvre belonged to an identifiable strand of right-wing political and religious opinion in French society that originated among the defeated royalists after the 1789 French Revolution. Lefebvre's political and theological outlook mirrored that of a significant number of conservative members of French society under the French Third Republic (1870–1940). The Third Republic was rife with conflicts between the secular Left and the Catholic Right, with many individuals on both sides espousing distinctly radical positions (see, for example, the article on the famous Dreyfus affair). Thus it has been said that "Lefebvre was... a man formed by the bitter hatreds that defined the battle lines in French society and culture from the French Revolution to the Vichy regime".

Lefebvre's first biographer, the English traditionalist writer Michael Davies, wrote in the first volume of his Apologia Pro Marcel Lefebvre:

In France political feeling tends to be more polarized, more extreme, and far more deeply felt than in England. It can only be understood in the light of the French Revolution and subsequent history... At the risk of a serious over-simplification, it is reasonable to state that up to the Second World War Catholicism in France tended to be identified with right-wing politics and anti-Catholicism with the left... [Lefebvre's] own alleged right-wing political philosophy is nothing more than straight-forward Catholic social teaching as expounded by the Popes for a century or more...

In a similar vein, the pro-SSPX English priest Michael Crowdy wrote, in his preface to his translation of Lefebvre's Open Letter to Confused Catholics:

We must remember that Lefebvre is writing against the background of France, where ideas are generally more clear‑cut than they are in Great Britain. ... Take the word "socialism", for example; that means to some of us, first and foremost, a social ideal of brotherhood and justice. We have had our Christian socialists. On the Continent, however, Socialism is uncompromisingly anti‑religious, or almost a substitute for religion, and Communism is seen as the natural development from it. This is the Socialism the Archbishop is writing about. And when he rejects Liberalism, he is not thinking of the [British] Liberal Party ... but of that religious liberalism that exalts human liberty above the claims of God or of His Church ...

=== Theological positions ===
Lefebvre was associated with the following positions:

- The rejection of 'false' or 'aberrant' ecumenism in favour of Catholic exclusivism;
- The espousal of pragmatic religious tolerance instead of the principle of religious liberty;
- The rejection of collegiality within the church in favour of strict papal supremacy;
- Opposition to the replacement of the Tridentine Mass with the Mass of Paul VI.

=== Political positions ===
Political positions espoused by Lefebvre included the following:

- Condemnation of the 1789 French Revolution and what he called its "Masonic and anti-Catholic principles".
- Support for the "Catholic order" of the authoritarian French Vichy government (1940–1944) of Marshal Philippe Pétain.
- Support for the National Front led by Jean-Marie Le Pen.
- Opposition to Muslim immigration into Europe. In 1990, Lefebvre was convicted in a French court and sentenced to pay a fine of 5,000 francs when he stated in this connection that "it is your wives, your daughters, your children who will be kidnapped and dragged off to a certain kind of places [sic] as they exist in Casablanca".

== Society of Saint Pius X ==
=== Lawful formation ===
After retiring from the post of Superior General of the Holy Ghost Fathers, Lefebvre was approached by traditionalists from the French Seminary in Rome who had been refused tonsure, the rite by which, until 1973, a seminarian became a cleric. They asked for a conservative seminary to complete their studies. After directing them to the University of Fribourg, Switzerland, Lefebvre was urged to teach these seminarians personally. In 1969, he received permission from the local bishop to establish a seminary in Fribourg, which opened with nine students, moving to Écône, Switzerland in 1971.

Lefebvre proposed to his seminarians the establishment of a society of priests without vows. In November 1970, Bishop François Charrière of Fribourg established, on a provisional (ad experimentum) basis for six years, the International Priestly Society of Saint Pius X (SSPX) as a "pious union". He chose the name of Pope Saint Pius X as the patron saint of the society, because of his admiration for the pontiff's stance on modernism.

=== Early opposition ===
In November 1972, the bishops of France, gathered as the Plenary Assembly of French Bishops at Lourdes, whose theological outlook was quite different from Lefebvre's, treated the then-legal Écône seminary with suspicion and referred to it as Séminaire sauvage or "Outlaw Seminary". They indicated that they would incardinate none of the seminarians. Cardinal Secretary of State Jean-Marie Villot accused Lefebvre before Pope Paul VI of making his seminarians sign a condemnation of the Pope, which Lefebvre vigorously denied.

=== Apostolic Visitors ===
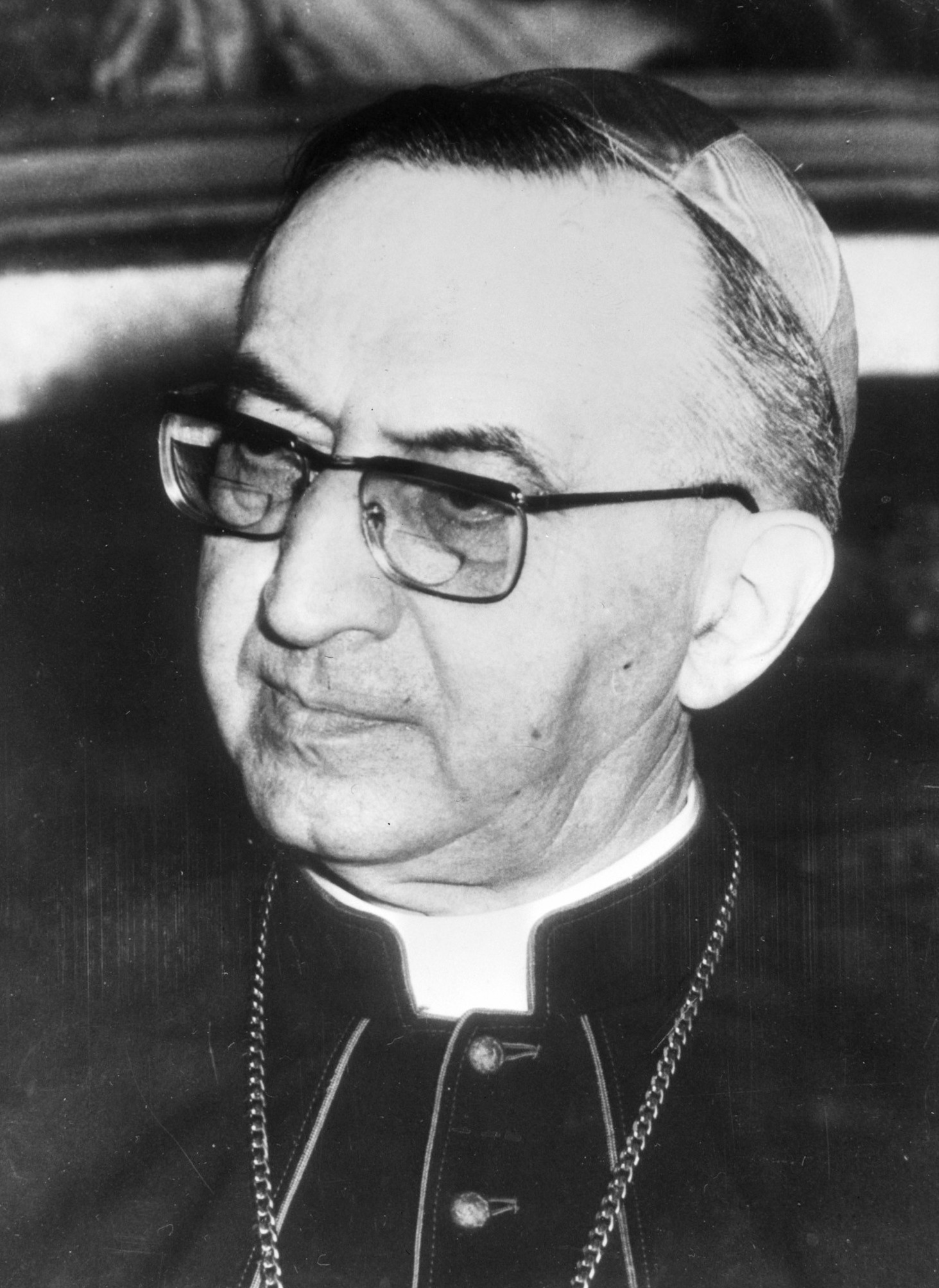
Cardinal Secretary of State Jean-Marie Villot

In November 1974, two Belgian priests carried out a rigorous inspection on the instructions of a commission of cardinals, producing, the SSPX claims, a favourable report. In what he later described as a mood of "doubtlessly excessive indignation", on 21 November 1974, Lefebvre wrote a "Declaration" in which he criticised the modernist and liberal trends that he saw in the reforms being undertaken within the church at that time:

We adhere with all our heart and all our soul to Catholic Rome, guardian of the Catholic Faith and the traditions necessary to maintain it, and to Eternal Rome, mistress of wisdom and truth. On the other hand we refuse and have always refused to follow the Rome of the neo-Modernist and the new Protestant trend which was clearly evident in the Second Vatican Council and, after the Council in all the reforms which flowed from it.

The Commission of Cardinals declared in reply that the declaration was "unacceptable on all points". At the same time, the French episcopate indicated that they would not incardinate any of Lefebvre's priests in their dioceses.

In January 1975, Bishop Pierre Mamie, who had succeeded Charrière in Fribourg in 1970, determined that the SSPX's status as a "pious union" should end. On 24 January 1975, he asked the prefect of the Sacred Congregation for Religious, Cardinal Arturo Tabera, to terminate its status as a "pious union".

On 13 February, Lefebvre was invited to Rome for a meeting with the commission of cardinals, which he described as "a close cross-examination of the judicial type", regarding the contents of his "Declaration", followed by a second meeting on 3 March. In May, the commission announced it approved Mamie's plan. Lefebvre contended that canon law gave the pope alone the authority to suppress a religious congregation, and only by his direct decree.

Tabera responded in April, expressing full agreement and telling Mamie to proceed himself, and Mamie suppressed the SSPX on 6 May 1975, effective immediately. (Note: Pope Paul canonically suppressed the SSPX and its seminary in 1975.) This action was upheld by Pope Paul, who wrote to Lefebvre in June 1975. Lefebvre nevertheless continued his work, citing legal advice from canon lawyers that the Society had not been "legally suppressed" and that the Society continued to enjoy the privilege of incardinating its own priests. Lefebvre also argued that there were insufficient grounds for suppression as the Apostolic Visitors, by the Commission's own admission, delivered a positive report, and that since his Declaration had not been condemned by the Congregation for the Doctrine of the Faith, he appealed, twice, to the appellate court of the church, the Apostolic Signatura. Lefebvre later wrote that Cardinal Villot blocked the move, and one of his supporters wrote that Villot threatened the Prefect of the Apostolic Signatura, Cardinal Dino Staffa, with dismissal if the appeals were not denied.

In 1976, Mamie warned Lefebvre that saying Mass though Catholic Church authorities had forbidden him from exercising his priestly functions would further exacerbate his relationship with Rome.

=== Disagreement with the Vatican ===
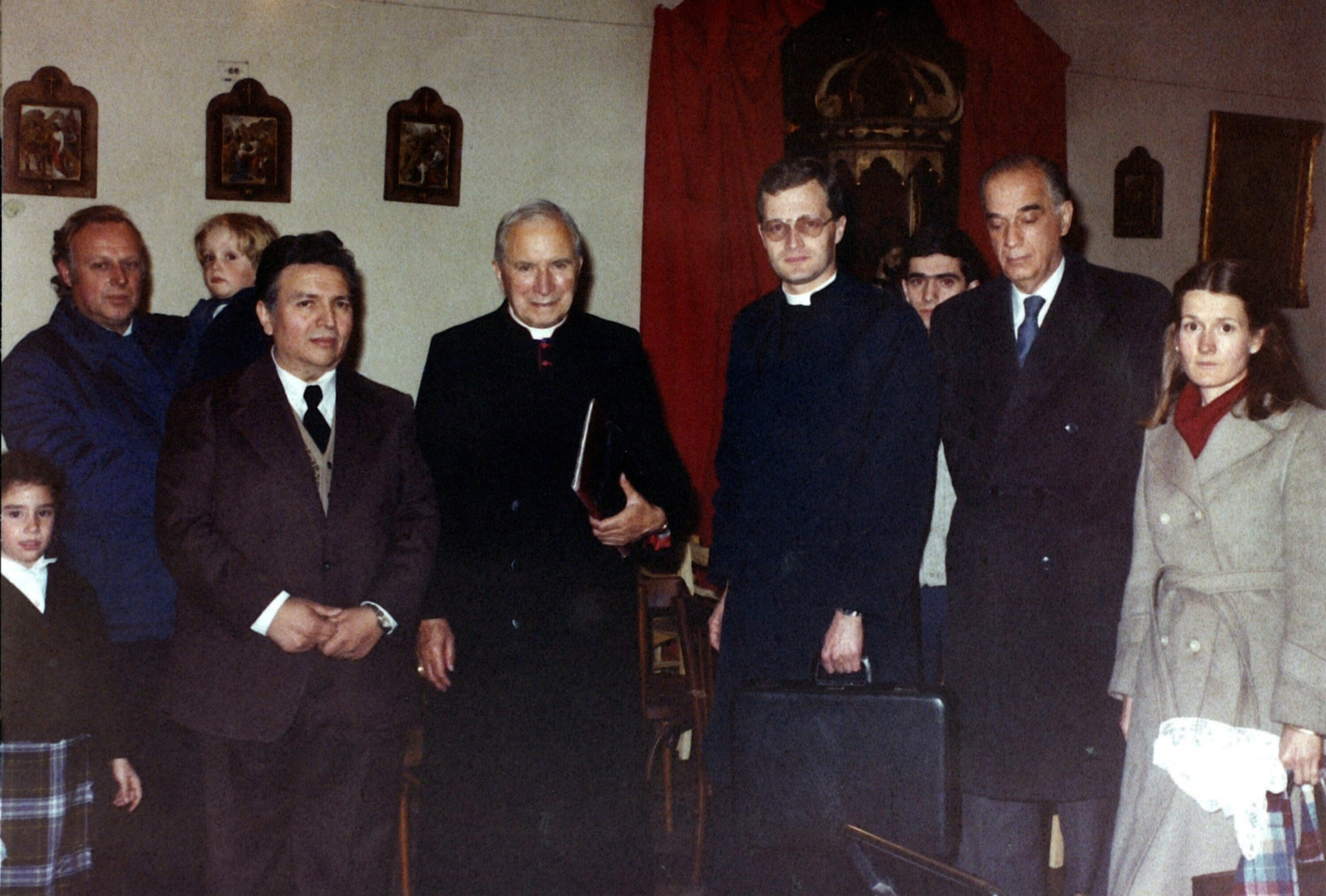
Lefebvre in Córdoba, Argentina, in 1980

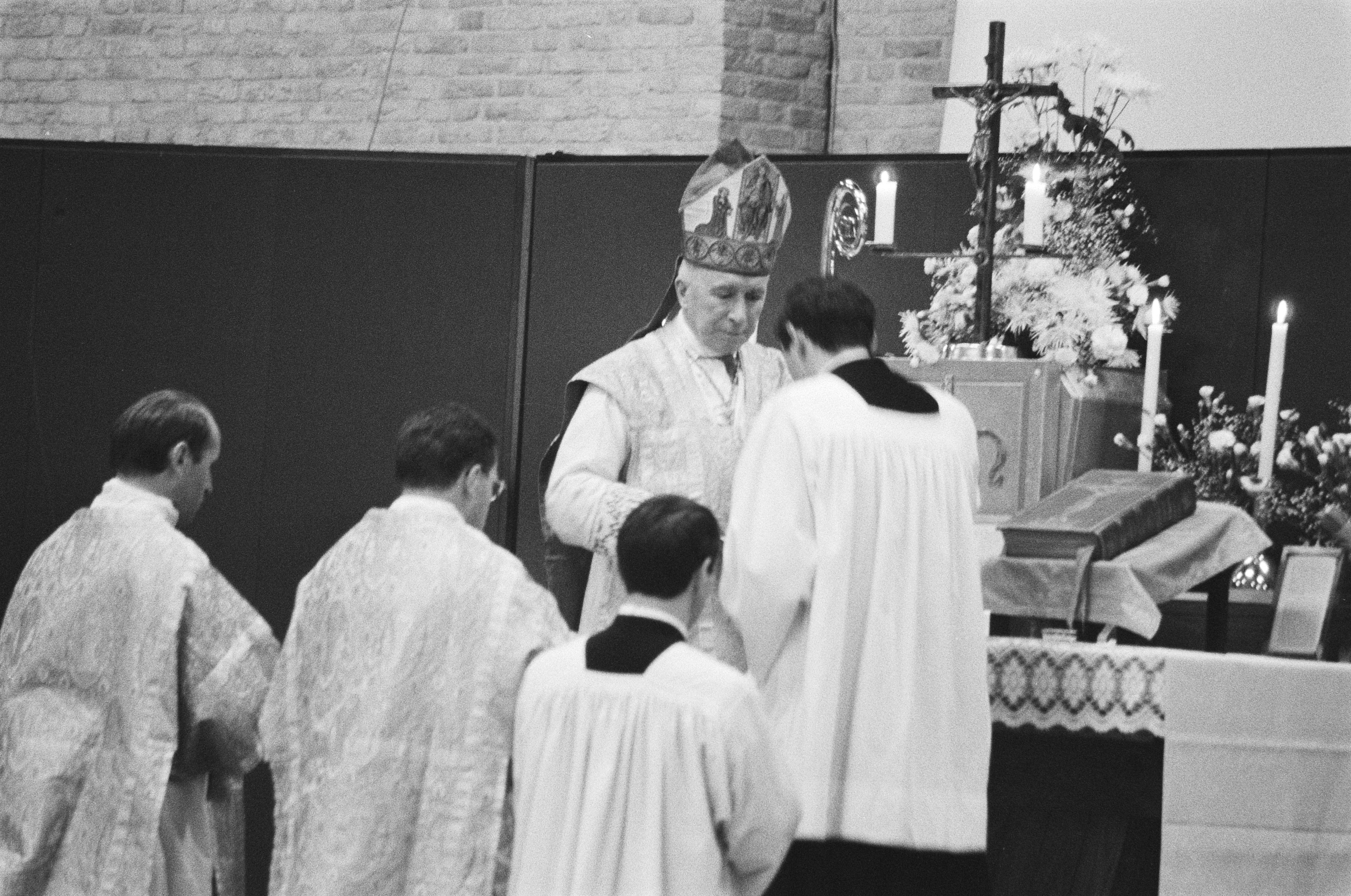
Lefebvre in 1981

During the consistory of 24 May 1976, Pope Paul VI criticized Lefebvre by name and appealed to him and his followers to change their minds.

On 29 June 1976, Lefebvre went ahead with planned priestly ordinations without the approval of the local bishop and despite receiving letters from Rome forbidding them. As a result Lefebvre was suspended a collatione ordinum, i.e., forbidden to ordain any priests. A week later, the Prefect of the Congregation for Bishops informed him that, to have his situation regularized, he needed to ask the pope's pardon. Lefebvre responded with a letter claiming that the modernization of the church was a "compromise with the ideas of modern man" originating in a secret agreement between high dignitaries in the church and senior Freemasons before the council. Lefebvre was then notified that, since he had not apologized to the pope, he was suspended a divinis, i.e., he could no longer legally administer any of the sacraments. Lefebvre remarked that he had been forbidden from celebrating the new rite of Mass. Pope Paul apparently took this seriously and stated that Lefebvre "thought he dodged the penalty by administering the sacraments using the previous formulas". In spite of his suspension, Lefebvre continued to celebrate Mass and to administer the other sacraments, including the conferral of Holy Orders to the students of his seminary.

Pope Paul received Lefebvre in audience on 11 September 1976, and one month later wrote to him a letter severely admonishing him and repeating the appeal he had made at the audience. In his letter to Lefebvre, Paul VI demanded that he declare his adherence to the Second Vatican Council and to every one of its documents, in their obvious meaning (sensu obvio); that the same declaration make clear his acceptance of the decrees published by Paul after the Council, particularly acknowledging the legitimate force of the reformed liturgy, and the pope's right to command that such a reform be received and used by the whole Christian people; that he confess the obligatory force of the norms of canon law then in force, which for the most part still agreed with the 1917 Code; that he retract his serious accusations and slanderous insinuations against Pope Paul, the integrity of his faith, and his fidelity to his office as the successor of Peter; and that he acknowledge the authority of bishops to forbid him to preach or administer the sacraments in their dioceses. These, Paul said, belonged to the bare minimum of the duties of a Catholic bishop. Furthermore, while Paul declared himself unable to revoke the juridical suppression of the FSSPX because it had been founded on a spirit of opposition to the Council and its implementation, in order to correct the faults in Lefebvre's work rather than destroy the good it had produced, he called upon Lefebvre to commit the government of his foundations, especially his seminaries, to the Holy See, pledging to remit the sanctions upon the priests Lefebvre had already ordained if they would subscribe to the same declaration of assent, and to provide for the religious houses and priories founded by Lefebvre on a case-by-case basis in consultation with the bishops of the places where they were located. The Pope reminded Lefebvre of his duty of obedience to the Chair of Peter, quoting the dogmatic constitutions Pastor aeternus (1870, First Vatican Council) and Lumen gentium (1964, Second Vatican Council).

Following the death of Paul VI, both Pope John Paul I and Pope John Paul II made various attempts to reconcile the FSSPX with the Church; the latter received Lefebvre in audience sixty days after his 1978 election, where he repeatedly expressed his desire for peace.

== Écône consecrations ==
In a 1987 sermon, Lefebvre, his health failing at age 81, announced his intention to consecrate a bishop to carry on his work after his death. Under Catholic canon law, the consecration of a bishop without the permission of the pope incurs excommunication: "A bishop who consecrates someone a bishop without a pontifical mandate and the person who receives the consecration from him incur a latae sententiae excommunication reserved to the Apostolic See".

In 1987, Lefebvre tried to reach an agreement with Cardinal Joseph Ratzinger, Prefect of the Congregation for the Doctrine of the Faith. However, on 4 September 1987, in Écône, Lefebvre stated that the Vatican was in apostasy and that he would no longer collaborate with Ratzinger.

On 5 May 1988, Lefebvre signed an agreement with Ratzinger to regularize the situation of the Society of St Pius X. Ratzinger agreed that one bishop would be consecrated for the Society, to be approved by the pope.

=== Breaking of the agreement, consecrations ===
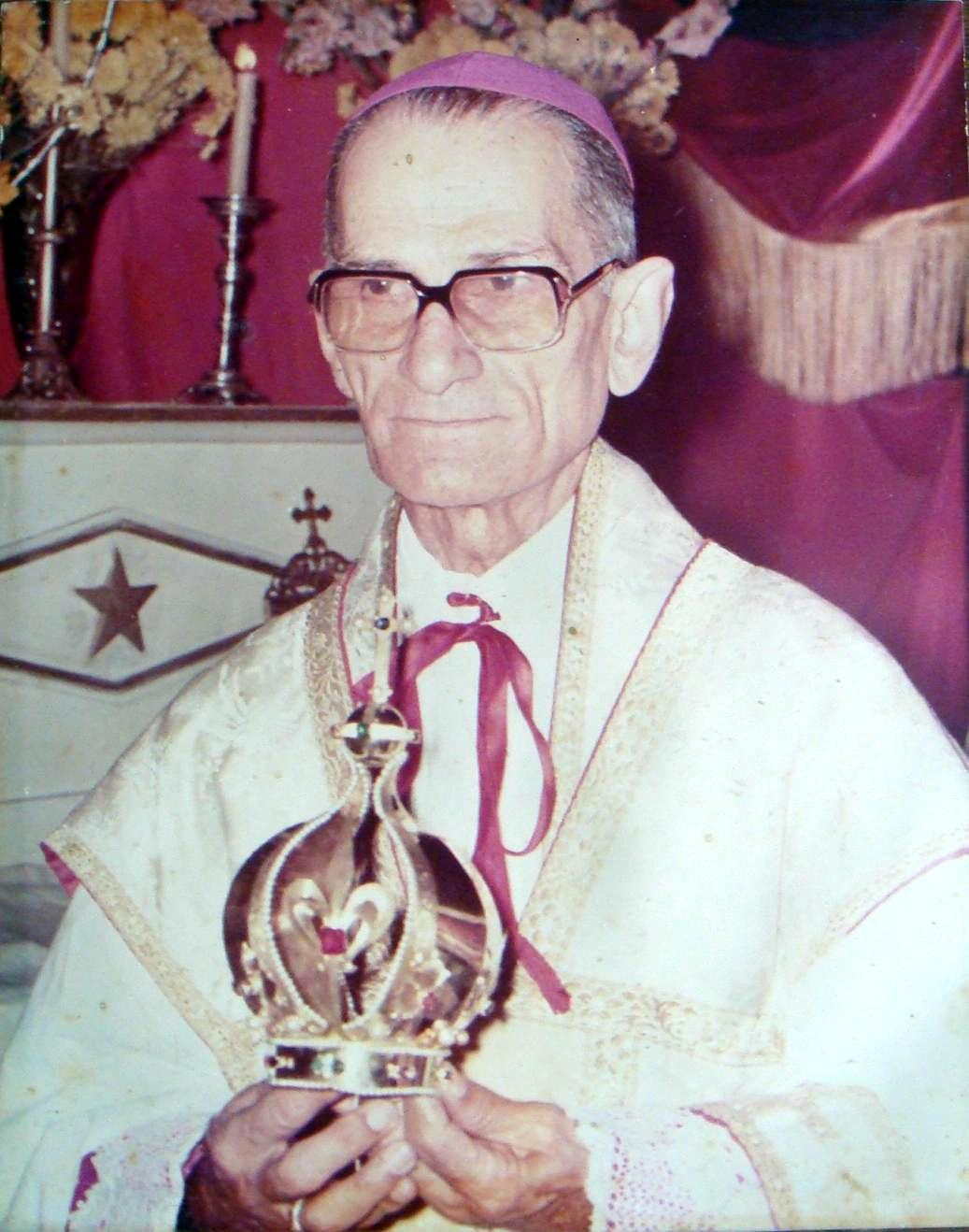
Antônio de Castro Mayer in 1980

Shortly after the agreement, however, Lefebvre announced that he had received a note from Ratzinger that asked him "to beg pardon for [his] errors", which he interpreted to mean that he would be made to accept the teachings of the Second Vatican Council and the "spirit of Assisi". Lefebvre referred to the alleged prophecy of Our Lady of La Salette that "Rome will lose the Faith" and declared himself obliged to consecrate a successor—if necessary, without papal approval. As the agreement did not specify a date for the episcopal consecration, should Lefebvre have died before it was granted, the Society would have been unable to ordain any seminarians and forced into submission to the Holy See.

Lefebvre dubbed his plan "Operation Survival":

That is why, taking into account the strong will of the present Roman authorities to reduce Tradition to naught, to gather the world to the spirit of Vatican II and the spirit of Assisi, we have preferred to withdraw ourselves and to say that we could not continue. It was not possible. We would have evidently been under the authority of Cardinal Ratzinger, President of the Roman Commission, which would have directed us; we were putting ourselves into his hands, and consequently putting ourselves into the hands of those who wish to draw us into the spirit of the Council and the spirit of Assisi. This was simply not possible.

Pope John Paul II appealed to him not to proceed in "a schismatic act", warning of "theological and canonical consequences".

On 30 June 1988, Lefebvre, with Bishop Emeritus Antônio de Castro Mayer of Campos, Brazil, as co-consecrator, consecrated four SSPX priests as bishops: Bernard Tissier de Mallerais, Richard Williamson, Alfonso de Galarreta and Bernard Fellay.

Shortly before the consecrations, Lefebvre gave the following sermon:

... this ceremony, which is apparently done against the will of Rome, is in no way a schism. We are not schismatics! If an excommunication was pronounced against the bishops of China, who separated themselves from Rome and put themselves under the Chinese government, one very easily understands why Pope Pius XII excommunicated them. There is no question of us separating ourselves from Rome, nor of putting ourselves under a foreign government, nor of establishing a sort of parallel church as the Bishops of Palmar de Troya have done in Spain. They have even elected a pope, formed a college of cardinals... It is out of the question for us to do such things. Far from us be this miserable thought to separate ourselves from Rome!

The next day, 1 July, the Congregation for Bishops issued a decree stating that this was a schismatic act and that all six direct participants had incurred automatic excommunication.

=== Aftermath ===
On 2 July, Pope John Paul II condemned the consecration in his apostolic letter Ecclesia Dei, in which he stated that the consecration constituted a schismatic act and that the bishops and priests involved were automatically excommunicated:

In itself, this act was one of disobedience to the Roman Pontiff in a very grave matter and of supreme importance for the unity of the church, such as is the ordination of bishops whereby the apostolic succession is sacramentally perpetuated. Hence such disobedience – which implies in practice the rejection of the Roman primacy – constitutes a schismatic act. In performing such an act, notwithstanding the formal canonical warning sent to them by the Cardinal Prefect of the Congregation for Bishops on 17 June last, Mons. Lefebvre and the priests Bernard Fellay, Bernard Tissier de Mallerais, Richard Williamson and Alfonso de Galarreta, have incurred the grave penalty of excommunication envisaged by ecclesiastical law (cf. Code of Canon Law, can. 1382).

Lefebvre responded by contradicting Pope John Paul II, saying that he and the other clerics involved had not "separated themselves from Rome" and were not schismatic. He invoked canon 1323 of the 1983 Code of Canon Law that they "found themselves in a case of necessity", not having succeeded, as they said, in making "Rome" understand that "this change which has occurred in the Church" since the Second Vatican Council was "not Catholic". (Note: "Thus, we find ourselves in a case of necessity. We have done all we could, trying to help Rome to understand that they had to come back to the attitudes of the holy Pius XII and of all his predecessors. Bishop de Castro Mayer and myself have gone to Rome, we have spoken, we have sent letters, several times to Rome. We have tried by these talks, by all these means, to succeed in making Rome understand that, since the Council and since aggiornamento, this change which has occurred in the Church is not Catholic, is not in conformity to the doctrine of all times. This ecumenism and all these errors, this collegiality — all this is contrary to the Faith of the Church, and is in the process of destroying the Church.") In a letter addressed to the four priests he was about to consecrate as bishops, Lefebvre wrote: "I do not think one can say that Rome has not lost the Faith."

On 18 July, twelve priests and some seminarians led by Josef Bisig left the SSPX because of the Écône consecrations. Bisig became the first superior general of the newly formed Priestly Fraternity of Saint Peter (FSSP), a group that reached an agreement with the Holy See.

== Death ==
Lefebvre died from cancer on 25 March 1991 at the age of 85 in Martigny, Switzerland. Eight days later he was buried in the crypt at the society's international seminary in Écône. Archbishop Edoardo Rovida, Apostolic Nuncio to Switzerland, and Bishop Henri Schwery of Sion, the local diocese, came and prayed at his body.

== Legacy of the 1988 consecrations ==
=== Lifting of excommunications ===
On 10 March 2009, at the request of the four surviving bishops, Pope Benedict XVI lifted their excommunications. In a letter to the bishops of the entire Church, Benedict offered this clarification:

The fact that the Society of Saint Pius X does not possess a canonical status in the Church is not, in the end, based on disciplinary but on doctrinal reasons. As long as the Society does not have a canonical status in the Church, its ministers do not exercise legitimate ministries in the Church.

One of the four bishops, Richard Williamson, was subsequently expelled from the FSSPX in 2012 and excommunicated again in 2015 by Pope Francis for consecrating a bishop without permission of the Holy See.

=== 2026 Consecrations ===
On 1 July 2026, SSPX again consecrated four new bishops in a ceremony celebrated at Écône, 38 years to the day after the original consecrations. As in 1988, the Vatican's Congregation for the Doctrine of the Faith issued a statement declaring the consecrators as well as the four newly ordained Bishops excommunicated. The statement also warned all lay adherents of the SSPX that the Society is again considered a schismatic group and thus its followers also incur an excommunication.

== Works ==
- Lefebvre, Marcel (1998). A Bishop Speaks: Writings & Addresses, 1963–1974. Kansas City, Mo.: Angelus Press. ISBN 0-935952-16-0.
- Lefebvre, Marcel (1998). I Accuse the Council! (2nd ed.). Kansas City, Mo.: Angelus Press. ISBN 978-0-935952-68-1.
- Lefebvre, Marcel (1987). Open Letter to Confused Catholics. Kansas City, Mo.: Angelus Press. ISBN 978-0-935952-13-1. Translated from the original book: Lefèbvre, Marcel (1985). Lettre Ouverte aux Catholiques Perplexes (in French). Paris: A. Michel. ISBN 978-2-226-02325-4.
- Lefebvre, Marcel (1997). Against the Heresies. Kansas City, Mo.: Angelus Press. ISBN 978-0-935952-28-5.
- Lefebvre, Marcel (1988). They Have Uncrowned Him: From Liberalism to Apostasy, the Conciliar Tragedy. Dickinson, Tex: Angelus Press. ISBN 0-935952-05-5.
- Lefebvre, Marcel (2000). The Mystery of Jesus: the Meditations of Archbishop Marcel Lefebvre. Kansas City, Mo.: Angelus Press. ISBN 978-1-892331-02-1.
- Lefebvre, Marcel (2001). Religious Liberty Questioned – The Dubia: My Doubts about the Vatican II Declaration of Religious Liberty. Kansas City, Mo.: Angelus Press. ISBN 978-1-892331-12-0.
- Lefebvre, Marcel (2007). The Mass of All Time: the Hidden Treasure. Kansas City, Mo.: Angelus Press. ISBN 978-1-892331-46-5.

== See also ==
- Marcel Lefebvre – Archbishop in Stormy Times, 2012 documentary film based on the biography by Bishop Bernard Tissier de Mallerais
- François Ducaud-Bourget

== Notes ==
Catholic Church titles
| Preceded by Edgar Anton Häring | — TITULAR — Bishop of Anthedon; 12 June 1947 – 22 September 1948 | Succeeded by John Baptist Choi Deok-hong |
| Preceded by Emile Yelle | — TITULAR — Archbishop of Arcadiopolis in Europa; 22 September 1948 – 14 September 1955 | Succeeded by Auguste-Siméon Colas |
| Preceded by Auguste François Louis Grimault | Apostolic Vicar of Dakar; 12 June 1947 – 14 September 1955 | |
| New title | Archbishop of Dakar; 14 September 1955 – 23 January 1962 | Succeeded by Hyacinthe Thiandoum |
| Preceded by Aimable Chassaigne | Archbishop^{1}-Bishop of Tulle; 23 January 1962 – 11 August 1962 | Succeeded by Henri Clément Victor Donze |
| Preceded by Francis Griffin | Superior General of the Congregation of the Holy Spirit; 27 July 1962 – 29 October 1968 | Succeeded by Joseph Lécuyer |
| Preceded by Ildebrando Antoniutti | — TITULAR — Archbishop of Synnada in Phrygia; 7 August 1962 – 10 December 1970 | Vacant |
Notes and references
1. Retained Personal Title
