= René Lefebvre =

French factory-owner

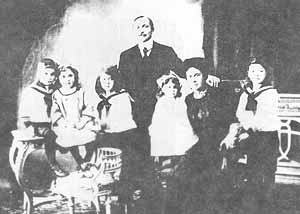
- René Lefebvre and his family
- Born: February 23, 1879
- Died: March 4, 1944 (aged 65)
- Occupation: Factory owner
- Children: Marcel Lefebvre

René Charles Joseph Marie Lefebvre (23 February 1879 – 4 March 1944) was a French factory-owner from Tourcoing, who died in the German concentration camp in Sonnenburg, in the Province of Brandenburg, where he had been imprisoned by the German Gestapo because of his work for the French Resistance and British Intelligence. René Lefebvre was the father of French Roman Catholic archbishop Marcel Lefebvre, the founder of the international Traditionalist Catholic organisation Priestly Fraternity of Saint Pius X (FSSPX).

== Life ==
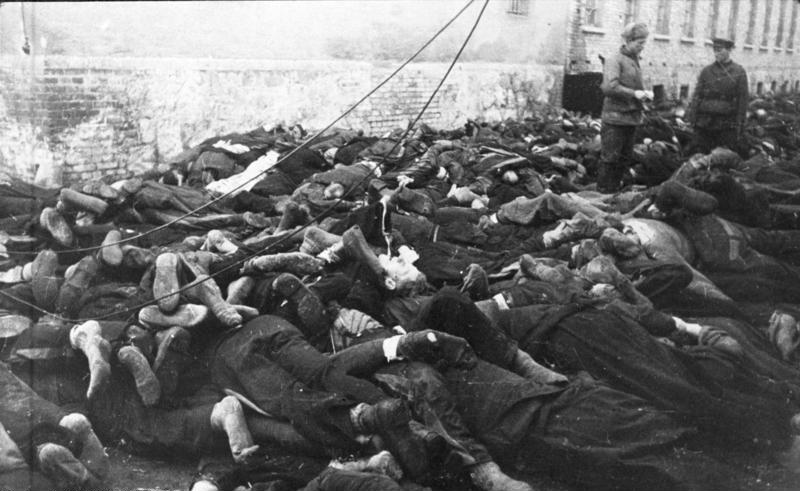
Victims of Sonnenburg concentration camp. Bundesarchiv picture of 1945

Lefebvre was born in Tourcoing in Nord, in northern France in 1879, from a family which gave almost fifty of its members to the Church since 1738, including a cardinal, a few bishops and many priests and religious. He was a devout Catholic who brought his children to daily Mass. In 1923, he advised two of his sons, Marcel and René, to begin studies for the priesthood at the French Seminary in Rome. Of his eight children, two became missionary priests, three girls enrolled in different religious congregations and the other three founded large Catholic families.

Lefebvre was also an outspoken monarchist who directed a spy-ring for British Intelligence when Tourcoing was occupied by the Imperial German Army during World War I.

Later, during World War II, when Nazi Germany occupied parts of France, he resumed this work, smuggling soldiers and escaped prisoners to un-occupied France and London. He was arrested and sentenced to death in Berlin on 28 May 1942 for "complicity with the enemy and recruitment of young people to bear arms against the Greater German Reich". He was sent to KZ Sonnenburg, a former prison converted into a concentration camp, mainly holding Communist and Social Democrat activists. Lefebvre died in Sonnenburg after one year. His body has never been recovered.

== Legacy ==
On 16 July 1953, Lefebvre was decorated posthumously by the Government of the Fourth French Republic with the Médaille militaire for his active participation with the French Resistance. Lefebvre was married to Gabrielle Watine, who died in 1938.
