= Sokollu Mehmed Pasha Mosque, Lüleburgaz =

Mosque in Lüleburgaz, Kırklareli, Turkey

Sokollu Mehmed Pasha Mosque
- Lüleburgaz Sokollu Mehmet Paşa Camii
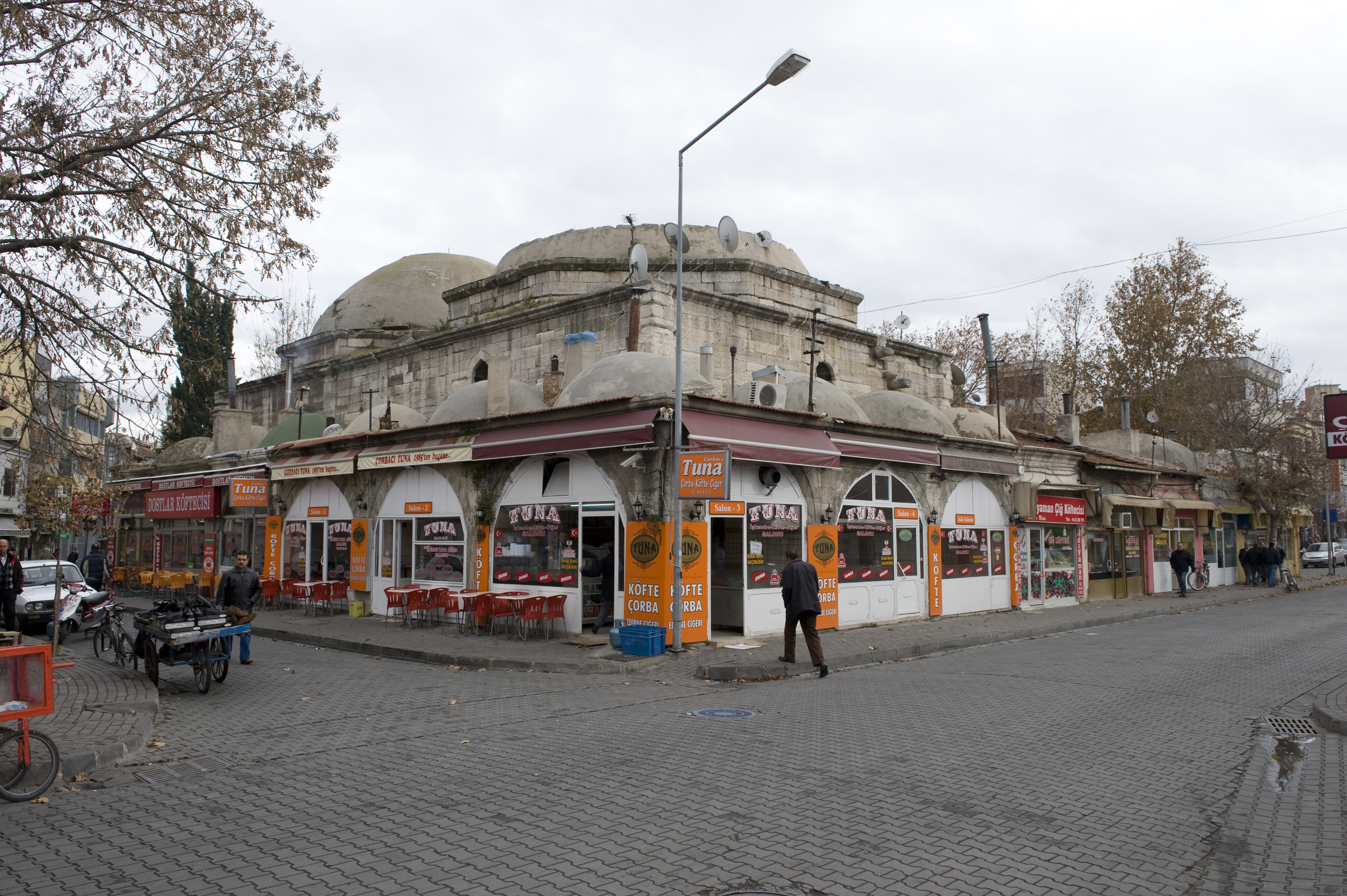

- Location of the mosque in Turkey.

Religion
- Affiliation: Sunni Islam

Location
- Location: Lüleburgaz, Kırklareli Province Turkey
- Coordinates: 41°24′27″N 27°21′05″E

Architecture
- Architect: Mimar Sinan
- Type: mosque
- Groundbreaking: 1565
- Completed: 1569-70

Specifications
- Dome dia. (outer): 12.5 m (41 ft)
- Minaret: 1

The Sokollu Mehmed Pasha Mosque (Turkish: Sokollu Mehmet Paşa Camii) is a 16th-century Ottoman mosque located in the town of Lüleburgaz in the Kırklareli Province of northwestern Turkey.

The mosque was commissioned by the grand vizier Sokollu Mehmed Pasha (in office 1565–1579) and designed by the imperial architect Mimar Sinan. It was built between 1565 and 1569–70 and forms part of a large complex that includes a medrese (theological school), a hospice and a caravansarai.

== See also ==
- List of Friday mosques designed by Mimar Sinan

== Sources ==
- Necipoğlu, Gülru (2005). The Age of Sinan: Architectural Culture in the Ottoman Empire. London: Reaktion Books. ISBN 978-1-86189-253-9.
