= Marcel Lefebvre – Archbishop in Stormy Times =

Marcel Lefebvre - Archbishop in Stormy Times
- Directed by: Jacques-Régis du Cray
- Written by: Bernard Tissier de Mallerais; Jacques-Régis du Cray
- Starring: Archbishop Marcel Lefebvre
- Distributed by: Association de défense du patrimoine chretien
- Release date: 29 September 2012 (France)
- Country: France
- Language: French
- Budget: 120,000 Euro

Monseigneur Lefebvre, un évêque dans la tempête (released as Marcel Lefebvre – Archbishop in Stormy Times in the US and UK) is a 2012 documentary film by French director Jacques-Régis du Cray, primarily based on the biography A biography of Archbishop Lefebvre written by Bishop Bernard Tissier de Mallerais.

Marcel Lefebvre (1905 – 1991) was a French Roman Catholic archbishop. Following a career as an Apostolic Delegate for West Africa and Superior General of the Holy Ghost Fathers, he took the lead in opposing the changes within the Church associated with the Second Vatican Council. In 1970, Lefebvre founded the Society of St. Pius X (SSPX). In 1988, against the express prohibition of Pope John Paul II, he consecrated four bishops to continue his work with the SSPX. The Holy See immediately declared that he and the other bishops who had participated in the ceremony had incurred automatic excommunication under Catholic canon law.

The documentary project, which started in 2006, was endorsed and received the active support of Bishop Bernard Fellay, Superior General of the Society of St. Pius X. It collects the stories of bishops, priests, the communities Archbishop Lefebvre served, as well as interviews of the surviving members of the Archbishop's family. According to the scriptwriter, the purpose of the documentary was "to make known to the multitude, and not just to the faithful of the Society of St. Pius X, a personage through whom we comprehend the crisis in the (Roman Catholic) Church."

The documentary premiered on 29 September 2012 at Le Grand Rex, the largest cinema, theater and music venue in Paris. After the first public showing in 2012, the film was sold in DVD format. The documentary is available in English, Spanish, German, Italian, Portuguese, and Polish.
