= Pontifical French Seminary =

Roman College

Coordinates: 41.8977°N 12.4773°E

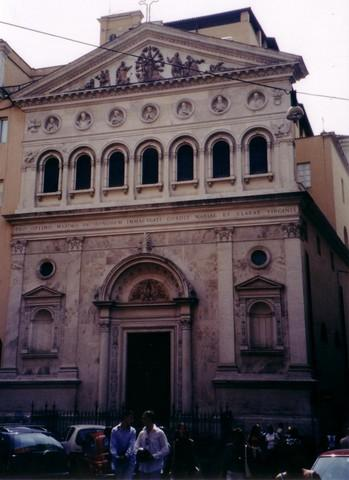
The facade of Santa Chiara - the church of the French seminary

The Pontifical French Seminary (La. Pontificium Seminarium Gallicum, Fr.: Séminaire Pontifical Français, It. Pontificio Seminario Francese) is a Roman College dedicated to training French-speaking Catholic priests.

== History ==
In 1853 the French bishops held the Council of La Rochelle, where they proposed a plan for a French Seminary in Rome to train priests strongly attached to the Holy See and able to counteract Gallican ideas. They successfully petitioned Pius IX to approve this idea. The seminary opened in 1853 with 12 students under the direction of Lamurien of the Congregation of the Holy Spirit, an order which was in charge of the college until 2009. Its first site was the old Irish college near Trajan's Forum.

In 1856 Pius IX assigned to the seminary the Church of Santa Chiara with what had been the adjoining Poor Clare convent, founded in 1560 by St. Charles Borromeo on the ruins of the baths of Agrippa. After the new Italian government evicted the College of Saint Thomas from the convent of Santa Maria sopra Minerva in 1873, the College was able to continue after the French seminary's Rector Tommaso Maria Zigliara offered refuge at the Pontifical French Seminary.

Santa Chiara was rebuilt on the plan of Notre-Dame-des-Victoires in Paris, in 1883 the monastery was entirely remodeled to suit its present purpose. Leo XIII declared it a pontifical seminary in 1902. As of the early 1900s there were between 100 and 120 seminarians.

Henri Le Floch was the rector in the early 20th century until the late 1920s. Le Floch's support of Action Française led to his removal at the request of the French government. One of Le Floch's students was Archbishop Marcel Lefebvre, the founder of the traditionalist Roman Catholic Society of Saint Pius X, and he attributed his conservatism to the time he spent in the seminary. The first priests belonging to the Society of Saint Pius X were from the French Seminary.

In 2009, management of the seminary was transferred from the Spiritans to the Bishops' Conference of France.

== College life ==
Most of the studies are conducted at the Gregorian University. The students are made up both of seminarians and existing priests pursuing further study. The seminary is located in the Via di Santa Chiara. Non-French students are also admitted.

== Notable alumni ==
- Cardinal Louis-Nazaire Bégin, Archbishop of Quebec and Primate of Canada
- Archbishop Marcel Lefebvre, Founder of the Society of Saint Pius X
- Cardinal Joseph-Charles Lefèbvre, Archbishop of Bourges
- Cardinal Emmanuel Célestin Suhard, Archbishop of Paris
- Cardinal Léon-Etienne Duval, Archbishop of Algiers
- Cardinal Gabriel-Marie Garrone, Prefect of the Congregation for Catholic Education
- Cardinal Alexis-Armand Charost, Archbishop of Rennes
- Archbishop Alain Paul Lebeaupin, Apostolic Nuncio to Kenya
- Paulin Martin, Biblical scholar
- Venerable Leon Dehon, founder of the Oblates of the Sacred Heart
