= Henri Le Floch =

French priest (1862–1950)

Henri Le Floch, C.S.Sp. (6 June 1862 – 21 February 1950) was a French priest of the Catholic Church who served as rector of the French Seminary (Collège Français) in Rome from 1904 to 1927.

== Biography ==
Henri Le Floch was born on 6 June 1862 in Caouet in the commune of Plonévez-Porzay, now in Kerlaz, in Brittany. He said he modeled himself on relatives who had remained faithful priests during the French Revolution. In 1875 he entered the Petit Séminaire de Pont-Croix and in 1878 the Petit Scolasticat de Langonnet, run by the Holy Ghost Fathers (Spiritans). In 1882 he continued his studies at the Grand Scolasticat in Chevilly. He was ordained a priest on 31 October 1886 and on 28 August 1887 he took his final vows as a member of the Holy Ghost Fathers. Because of health problems he was not allowed to join the African missions. Instead he worked in seminary education, serving in various locations as professor of rhetoric or philosophy, prefect of studies, and prefect of discipline. He earned his baccalaureate and then began studying for a licenciate in philosophy in Paris in 1894. He was named head of the Collège du Saint‑Esprit in Beauvais in September 1895. On 8 September 1900, he was appointed superior of the community in Chevilly and head of the Grand Scolasticat. His politics were traditional and conservative, showing no inclination to compromise with government attempts to restrict the role of the Church in the public sphere. During the 1902 legislative elections, he made his opposition to universal suffrage clear to his seminarians.

When the French government exerted control over religious orders under the Associations Act of 1 July 1901, it threatened the order with dissolution unless it could document its origins. (Note: The 1901 Law of Associations, which on its face guaranteed freedom of association, established a distinct regime for religious congregations aimed at limiting their influence on education.) The superior general of the Holy Ghost Fathers, Bishop Alexandre Le Roy, asked Le Floch to research the founding of the order in 1703 by Claude-François Poullart des Places. The order had come close to extinction in the early nineteenth century. It survived by being integrated into a congregation with a similar commitment to missionary work, the Society of the Holy Heart of Mary, founded by Francis Libermann in 1842. The two congregations were joined under the name of Congregation of the Holy Spirit under the protection of the Immaculate Heart of Mary. Until Le Floch's research, the Holy Ghost Fathers had regarded Libermann, whose life was well documented and whose writings they knew well, as their founder. Le Floch's research both satisfied the French government's requirements and gave the order a second founder as inspiration. His work ran to 550 pages and was published in 1906.

He became rector of the French Seminary in Rome in September 1904. During his tenure the number of seminarians increased from about 100 to 140 at the start of World War I and to 207 when he left, as French bishops sent more students to Rome as the government restricted their own activities. In his early years as rector he earned his doctorate in philosophy from the University of Louvain and a doctorate in theology at the Gregorian University. In developing academic programs and in his personal politics he was strictly anti-modernist, allied with those called intransigeants. This included a new emphasis on scripture as, writes one historian, "anti-modernism placed increasing emphasis on intellectual formation and was at first skeptical and then dismissive of social action". Like-minded officials in the Roman Curia saw he was named a consultor to several dicasteries, including the Holy Office, which in turn enhanced the seminary's reputation. His influence in Rome made him enemies among French prelates who did not share his view of church-state relations and papal supremacy. He began supporting Action Française in 1908, while objecting to the atheism of its founder and to violence.

In the fall of 1918, reflecting views widely held in France, an anonymous French author, likely Louis Canet, a young government bureaucrat, published a detailed indictment of Pope Benedict XV's role in the world war. He charged Benedict with playing a political role under the cover of the Church's spiritual mission and favoring a victory by Germany and its allies. The Holy See's Secretary of State Cardinal Pietro Gasparri tasked Le Floch with writing a detailed rebuttal, which appeared in Le Correspondant on 10 March 1919 under the title "The politics of Benedict XV". The Vatican supported its wide distribution and it was republished as a book. This raised Le Floch's profile and made him political enemies. In 1921, Canet opposed awarding the Legion of Honor to Le Floch, writing that he was "not a loyal citizen", that "grouped around him were all those who oppose the establishment of an honorable modus vivendi between the Holy See and France".

In 1925, during heated legislative debates on funding the French diplomatic mission to the Holy See, Édouard Herriot, president of the council of ministers, repeatedly denounced the French Seminary for its harmful influence on the French clergy, calling it a place where "political doctrines in direct contradiction of the principles and laws of the [French] Republic flourish". Others named Le Floch in connection with the suppression of books, decried the Seminary's influence on the selection of bishops and charged it was responsible for the adoption of the Roman collar in place of the French clergy's traditional clerical bands or rabat. (Note: The word rabat has come to be used as a synonym for dickey, a piece of black cloth that covers that part of a priest's chest that is not covered by a suit jacket. In France before the introduction of the Roman collar, it referred to a rectangular piece of black or white cloth that hung from the collar and covered only the center of the chest, familiar from depictions of such French clerics as Bossuet, John Vianney, and Jean-Baptiste de La Salle.) Herriot and others referenced specific statements made in classes at the Seminary.

In 1927, Pope Pius XI asked him to resign. The ostensible rationale was that his political views, especially his support for the right-wing political group Action Française and its founder Charles Maurras, were at odds with the Vatican's attempt at rapprochement with the French government. French government officials had also sought his removal and unsympathetic clerics both in France and Rome sought his removal. (Note: On 8 September 1926, Pope Pius had forbidden Catholics to belong to Action Française or read its publications.) French Cardinal Louis Billot, an ideological ally of Le Floch, resigned from the College of Cardinals in September 1927 because he could not support the pope's position on Action Française.

In December 1927, Le Floch drew a distinction between the role of clerics and political activists. He wrote that he and Billot "fought against liberalism, secularism, the principles of the revolution, from the doctrinal point of view. Now it so happened that the Action Française was fighting against the same plagues, but on the political plane."

Le Floch resigned and returned to France. He lived first in his order's seminary at Orly and later in a chateau in the south of France. His students published a large volume of essays in 1937 to mark the fiftieth anniversary of his ordination. In 1939 he visited Rome and met privately with Pope Pius XII.

Archbishop Marcel Lefebvre, the outspoken critic of the Second Vatican Council who incurred excommunication for consecrating bishops without papal approval in 1988, credited Le Floch with providing him with an orthodox seminary formation, "leaving aside all personal ideas in order to embrace the mind of the Church".

Le Floch died on 21 February 1950 in Barbegal near Arles.

== See also ==
- Cardinal Louis Billot
