= Deva Holding A.S. =

Turkish pharmaceutical manufacturer

DEVA Holding A.S.
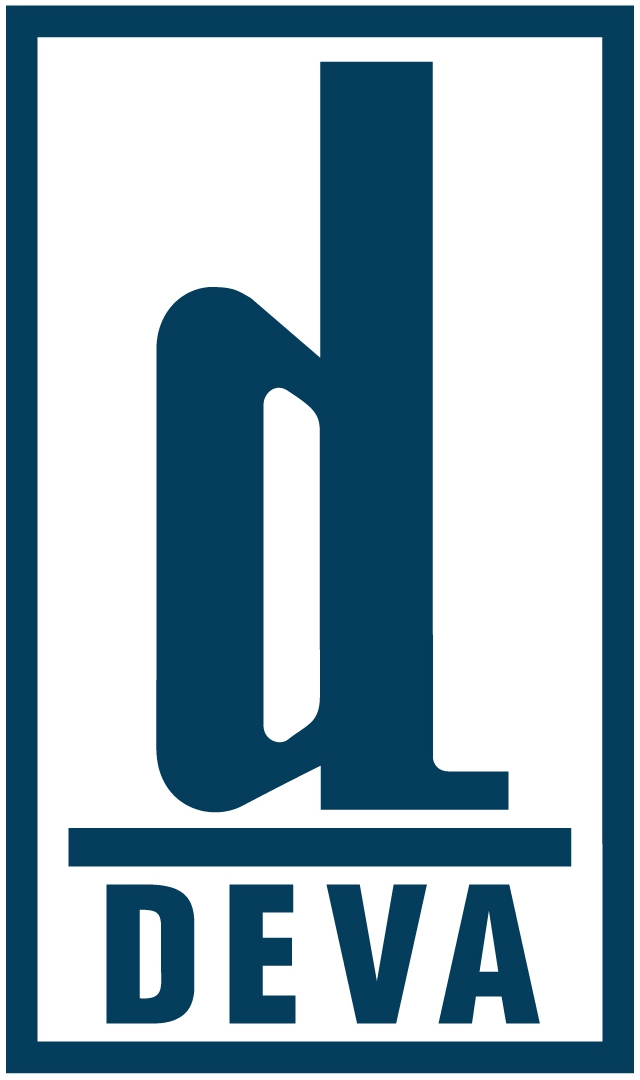
- Type: Pharmaceutical Company
- Traded as: BİST: DEVA
- Industry: Pharmaceuticals
- Founded: September 22, 1958
- Headquarters: Istanbul, Turkey
- Key people: Mr. Philipp Haas (Chairman of the Board of Directors & CEO)
- Products: pharmaceuticals
- Revenue: ▲US$423 million (2024)
- Operating income: ▼US$76 million (2024)
- Net income: ▼US$1.5 million (2024)
- Total assets: ▲US$855 million (2024)
- Total equity: ▲US$638 million (2024)
- Number of employees: 3.000
- Website: www.deva.com.tr/en

DEVA Holding A.Ş. is a Turkish pharmaceutical company operating since 1958. Its principal activities include the development, manufacture and marketing of human pharmaceuticals and active pharmaceutical ingredients. The company also operates in veterinary medicines, cologne, medical ampoules and food supplements.

A majority stake in the company was acquired by EastPharma in 2006. DEVA Holding is listed on Borsa Istanbul, and its chairman and chief executive officer is Philipp Haas.

As of 2025, the company had more than 675 products across 15 therapeutic areas. According to IQVIA data cited in its annual report, DEVA ranked third in the Turkish pharmaceutical market by unit sales in 2025, with a market share of 4.5%.

== Manufacturing operations ==
DEVA Holding operates three manufacturing facilities in Turkey, with an annual production capacity of approximately 620 million units.

The company manufactures a range of pharmaceutical dosage forms, including tablets, capsules, syrups, creams, ointments, gels, drops, inhalation products, sterile products, antibiotics, hormonal products and oncology medicines. It also manufactures active pharmaceutical ingredients, veterinary medicines, medical ampoules and cologne.

The company’s manufacturing facilities hold European Union Good Manufacturing Practice and United States Food and Drug Administration compliance approvals.

== Research and development ==
DEVA Holding conducts its research and development activities through DEVARGE. Its R&D activities include pharmaceutical and analytical development, biotechnology, active pharmaceutical ingredient development, bioequivalence, stability studies, scale-up and manufacturing processes. The company employs more than 400 people in its R&D organisation.

== International operations ==
As of 2025, DEVA Holding held 1,863 product registrations across 86 countries.

The company has operations in Europe, North America and other international markets. Part of its international activities is conducted under the Devatis brand.

== Other operations ==
The company’s veterinary pharmaceutical activities are carried out under the VETAŞ brand, while its cologne products are manufactured under the Boğaziçi Kolonyaları brand.
