= Europa (Roman province) =

Roman province

Coordinates: 41.2500°N 27.8667°E

Province of Europa Provincia Europae Ἐπαρχία Εὐρώπης
- Province of the Roman Empire
- 314–640s
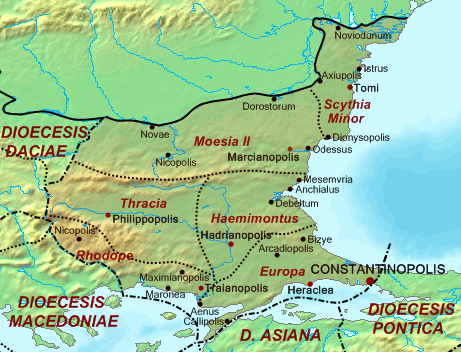
- Europa within the Diocese of Thrace c. 400.
- Capital: Perinthus
- Historical era: Late Antiquity
  - Reforms of Diocletian: 314
  - Thematic reforms: 640s
- Today part of: Turkey

Europa among the Balkan provinces of Byzantine Empire in the 6th century.

Europa (Greek: Ευρώπη) was a Roman province within the Diocese of Thrace.

== History ==
Established by Roman Emperor Diocletian (284–305), the province largely corresponds to what is modern day European Turkey. The province's capital was initially Arcadiopolis and subsequently Perinthus (later known as Heraclea; modern Marmara Ereğlisi).

Bordering only the provinces of Rhodope and Haemimontus to the west and northwest, Europa was a peninsula and was surrounded by water on three sides: the Black Sea to the northeast, the Bosphorus to the east, and the Sea of Marmara and Aegean Sea to the south and southeast.

The largest city along the Black Sea was Salmydessus. Along the coast of the Sea of Marmara were the cities of Perinthus (the capital; later known as Heraclea), Selymbria, Raidestus, and Callipolis. On the coast of the Aegean and at the mouth of the Hebrus river in the Melas Gulf was the city of Aenus (Thrace).

== Sources ==
- Rees, Roger (2004). Diocletian and the Tetrarchy. Edinburgh, UK: Edinburgh University Press. ISBN 9780748616602.
