= Bergule =

Town in ancient Thrace

Coordinates: 41°24′58″N 27°21′40″E

Bergule or Bergula or Bergoule (Ancient Greek: Βεργούλη), also Bergulium or Bergoulion (Βεργούλιον), also called Bergulae or Virgulae, was a town in ancient Thrace, which was in later times called Arcadiopolis, Arcadiupolis, or Arkadioupolis (Ἀρκαδιούπολις). It was noted by Ptolemy, and inhabited during Roman and Byzantine times. Under the name Arcadiopolis in Europa it was the seat of a bishop; no longer a residential see, it remains a titular see of the Roman Catholic Church.

Its site is located near Lüleburgaz in European Turkey.
