= To Catch a Thief (disambiguation) =

To Catch a Thief is a 1955 romantic thriller film directed by Alfred Hitchcock.

To Catch a Thief may also refer to:

== Film and television ==
- To Catch a Thief (1936 film), a 1936 British comedy film

=== Television episodes ===
- "To Catch a Thief" (Once Upon a Time in Wonderland), an episode of the TV series Once Upon a Time in Wonderland
- "To Catch a Thief", an episode of the Indian TV series The Suite Life of Karan & Kabir

== Literature ==
- "To Catch a Thief" (short story), a 1901 short story by E. W. Hornung
- To Catch a Thief, a 1934 Desmond Merrion novel by Cecil Street, writing as Miles Burton
- To Catch a Thief, a 1943 novel by Craig Rice, writing as Daphne Sanders
- To Catch a Thief (novel), a 1952 thriller novel by David F. Dodge, basis for the 1955 Hitchcock film
- To Catch a Thief, a 1997 novel by Francine Pascal; the 133rd installment in the Sweet Valley High series
- To Catch a Thief, a 2001 novel by Sherryl Woods, the third installment in the Calamity Janes series
- To Catch a Thief, a 2008 novel by Roberta Helmer, writing as Christina Skye, the eighth installment in the Draycott Abbey series
- To Catch a Thief, a 2018 Dungeons & Dragons novel by Matt Forbeck, the fourth installment in the Endless Quest series
- To Catch a Thief, a 2023 novel by Martha Brockenbrough
