= George Tanham =

George K. Tanham (1922-2003) was an expert on international security issues, especially regarding South Asia.

== Early life ==
A native of Tenafly, New Jersey, Tanham was a graduate of Princeton University. He served as an artillery officer in Europe during World War II and was a decorated combat veteran.

== Academic and professional career ==
After receiving his Ph.D. in history and political science from Stanford University, he taught military history at Caltech before joining RAND.

Tanham joined the American RAND Corporation in 1955 and held several positions before retiring in 1987, including leading Project AIR FORCE, i.e., the RAND liaison to the United States Air Force, from 1970 to 1975. He also served on the RAND Board of Trustees and was an advisory trustee at the time of his death.

Tanham's career in government included serving as associate director for counterinsurgency of the U.S Agency for International Development in South Vietnam from 1964 to 1965, and as special assistant for counterinsurgency to the American ambassador in Thailand from 1968 to 1970.

In the course of his career, Tanham received numerous fellowships and grants; served on various U.S. government committees; was editor-in-chief of the journal Studies in Conflict and Terrorism; and wrote several books.

His book, Communist Revolutionary Warfare: From the Vietminh to the Viet Cong, has been cited 222 times.

His essay, "Indian Strategic Thought", was "One of the most influential views on modern Indian strategic culture," according to George J. Gilboy and Eric Heginbotham. That article has been cited 95 times, (see Google Scholar), including Conley (2001), and other scholarly publications.

== See also ==
- Cold War
