= Herbert Dardik =

American vascular surgeon (1935–2020)

Herbert (Chaim) Dardik (May 17, 1935 – May 11, 2020) was a vascular surgeon who served as the chief of vascular surgery at Englewood Hospital and Medical Center in Englewood, New Jersey, and founded that institution's first vascular surgery fellowship program in 1978. Dardik made many developments in vascular surgery, including the first tissue-engineered bypass graft used to prevent gangrene and save lower limbs. In 2017 he earned the Society for Vascular Surgery's Lifetime Achievement Award for his contributions to the profession.

== Medical career ==
Dardik was born on May 17, 1935 to Russian immigrants in Long Branch, New Jersey. After receiving his medical degree from the New York University School of Medicine, Dardik completed his medical residency in general surgery at the Montefiore Medical Center. Following residency, Dardik specialized in the field of vascular surgery. In the 1970s, Dardik pioneered the use of umbilical veins as a source of graft tissue for bypass surgeries along with his brother Irving Dardik.

Dardik was an integral part in the development of several medical organizations dedicated to furthering medical research and education. He was a founding member of the Eastern Vascular Society and the Vascular Society of New Jersey, and helped to nationalize the Society for Clinical Vascular Surgery (SCVS). In 1987, he started the regular publication of the SCVS newsletter, a relatively new phenomenon among vascular societies at the time. He was also the director and founding member of the bloodless medicine and surgery program. Additionally, he conducted his own clinical research studying lower extremity bypass techniques, thrombolytics, and small vessel bypass indications and outcomes, among other subjects.

After eight years in Teaneck, New Jersey, Dardik and his family moved to nearby Tenafly in 1976. Dardik died of natural causes on May 11, 2020, at the age of 84.

== Honors ==
- Lifetime Achievement Award, Society for Vascular Surgery, 2017.
- Fellow of the American College of Surgeons.
- Inducted as a Member of the American College of Surgeons' Academy of Master Surgeon Educators in 2019.
- Recipient of the Hektoen Gold Medal from the American Medical Association in 1976 for work on developing the umbilical vein graft

== Selected publications ==
- "Hybrid Repair of an Intrathoracic Bilobed Subclavian Artery Aneurysm", Ann. Vasc. Surg., 2019
- "Aberrant Splenic Artery Complicated by Aneurysm During Pregnancy", J. Vasc. Surg. Cases Innov. Tech., 2018.
- "Atypical Infrarenal Aortic Coarctation", J. Vasc. Surg. Cases Innov. Tech, 2017.
- "Carotid Axillary Artery Bypass: An Option Following Failed Open and Percutaneous Procedures", Vascular, 2014.
- "Autologous Platelet-Rich Fibrin Matrix As Cell Therapy in the Healing of Chronic Lower-Extremity Ulcers" Wound Repair Regen., 2008.
- "Femoral Popliteal Bypass Employing Modified Human Umbilical Cord Vein: An Assessment of Early Clinical Results.", Cardiovasc Dis., 1976.
