= Irving Dardik =

American vascular surgeon

Irving Israel Dardik (October 3, 1936 – November 1, 2023) was an American vascular surgeon who taught at Albert Einstein College of Medicine and founded the Sports Medicine Council of the US Olympic Committee. Dardik was notable as being among the first medical doctors to endorse the use of chiropractic in sports, when he recommended in 1979 that the United States Olympic Committee include a Doctor of Chiropractic (D.C.) as a member of its medical team at all future Olympic Games. As a result, chiropractor George Goodheart attended the XIIIth Winter Olympic Games, in Lake Placid, NY, and the United States Olympic Training Center in Colorado Springs instituted a Volunteer Doctor Program for D.C.'s.

In 1980, Dardik helped direct the inaugural Olympic Sports Medicine Conference (Feb 26 through 29) in Boston.

In the early 1970s, together with his brother Herbert Dardik, he pioneered the use of umbilical veins as a source of graft tissue for bypass surgeries.

Dardik died on November 1, 2023, at the age of 87.

== "Supersonant waveenergy" theory ==
Dardik developed a system of treating diseases using wave form technology, which he called "supersonant waveenergy". His system basically involved exercise techniques that were designed to modulate the cardiac rhythms in order to amplify the body's natural wave frequencies to fight disease. Dardik was co-author (with Denis Waitley) of Quantum Fitness: Breakthrough to Excellence. In this book, Dardik promotes his wave energy techniques as an alternative fitness regimen.

== Disciplinary history ==
In 1995, Dardik was stripped of his license to practice medicine, following a successful lawsuit filed by a former patient, Ellen Burstein MacFarlane, a former consumer-action reporter who had been diagnosed with multiple sclerosis in 1985. Dardik had claimed in a 1991 New York Magazine cover story that he could cure multiple sclerosis with wave energy therapy.

Dardik charged MacFarlane and her family $100,000, with the promise that not only could he cure her multiple sclerosis, but also that he would personally be available for the treatment sessions. After receiving his fee, Dardik treated MacFarlane in person at most 10 times during a 10-month period, sending proxies intermittently. MacFarlane's disease progressed, and her condition worsened. MacFarlane wrote a book with her sister, Legwork: An Inspiring Journey Through a Chronic Illness (Lisa Drew/Simon & Schuster 1994), in which she asserted that Dardik robbed her of not only money, but also of her hope for recovery.

In July 1995, Dardik was found guilty of defrauding a total of five patients, including MacFarlane, by the State of New York Department of Health Administrative Review Board for Professional Medical Conduct, which revoked his New York medical license and fined him $40,000. MacFarlane died in 2004.

== Cold fusion ==
In 2004, Dardik put his waveenergy theory to use attempting to produce cold fusion. Working with Israeli company Energetics Technologies, his group claimed "startling results." Energetics Technologies is currently set up at the Business Incubator of the University of Missouri.

Dardik appears in The Believers, a 2012 film about cold fusion, in which he claims to use his theories to both explain cold fusion and to treat cold fusion proponent Martin Fleischmann for his Parkinson's disease.

== Legal history ==
In 1996, a New Jersey family court judge ordered that Dardik spend evenings in the Bergen County Jail until he could pay $24,000 towards spousal and child support arrears totaling $850,000.

In 2013, Dardik was again jailed by a New Jersey judge for support arrears totaling $1,205,300.03.

== Honors ==
- 1976 - AMA's Hektoen Gold medal (for the umbilical vein discovery).
- 2008 - Preparata medal of The International Society for Condensed Matter Nuclear Science.

== Bibliography ==
- Dardik, I; Waitley, D (1984). Quantum Fitness: Breakthrough to Excellence. Pocket Books. ISBN 978-0-671-50903-3.
- Dardik, I; et al. (July 1973). "Lateral T-Tube Duodenostomy: Duodenal Stump Management and Manometrics". AMA Arch Surg. 107 (1): 89–90. doi:10.1001/archsurg.1973.01350190075021. PMID 4714441.
- Dardik, I; et al. (October 1974). "Symmetrical Peripheral Gangrene". AMA Arch Surg. 109 (4): 588. doi:10.1001/archsurg.1974.01360040096028. PMID 4414419.
- Dardik, I; et al. (February 1975). "Routine Intraoperative Angiography: An Essential Adjunct in Vascular Surgery". Arch Surg. 110 (2): 184–190. doi:10.1001/archsurg.1975.01360080050008. PMID 1115618.
- Dardik, I; et al. (January 1976). "Arteriovenous Fistulas Constructed With Modified Human Umbilical Cord Vein Graft". Arch Surg. 111 (1): 60–62. doi:10.1001/archsurg.1976.01360190062010. PMID 1244813.

https://www.amazon.com/Nature-Discovery-SuperWaves-Changes-Everything/dp/1623369355/ref=sr_1_1?crid=8JPNEB0TBXVD&keywords=the+nature+of+nature+irving+dardik&qid=1699229024&s=books&sprefix=the+nature+of+nature+irving+dardik%2Cstripbooks%2C90&sr=1-1
