= Christie-Parsels House =

Historic house in New Jersey, US

- U.S. National Register of Historic Places
- New Jersey Register of Historic Places
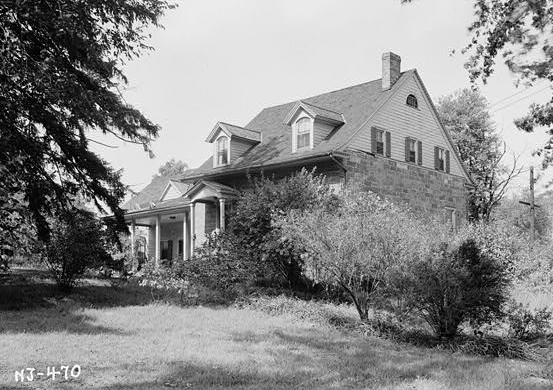

- Location within Bergen County, New Jersey Location within New Jersey Location within the United States
- Location: 195 Jefferson Avenue, Tenafly, New Jersey
- Coordinates: 40°55′55″N 73°58′19″W
- Built: 1804
- Architect: William P. Christie
- NRHP reference No.: 83001482
- NJRHP No.: 704

Significant dates
- Added to NRHP: January 10, 1983
- Designated NJRHP: October 10, 1980

The Christie-Parsels House is located in Tenafly, Bergen County, New Jersey, United States. The house was built in 1804 by William P. Christie. In 1836 Samuel Parsels erected a large wing on the eastern side of the original house. The house was added to the National Register of Historic Places on January 10, 1983.

== See also ==
- National Register of Historic Places listings in Bergen County, New Jersey
