= David Dodge (novelist) =

American novelist

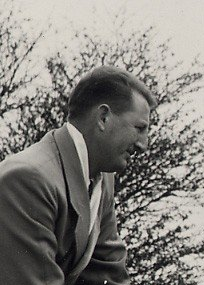
David Dodge in 1957

David Francis Dodge (August 18, 1910, Berkeley, California – August 8, 1974, San Miguel de Allende, Mexico) was an American author of mystery/thriller novels and humorous travel books. His first book was published in 1941. His fiction is characterized by tight plotting, brisk dialogue, memorable and well-defined characters, and often exotic locations. His travel writing documented the adventures and misadventures of the Dodge family (David, his wife Elva, and daughter Kendal) as they roamed around the world. Practical advice and information for the traveler on a budget are sprinkled liberally throughout the books.

== Biography ==
David Dodge was born in Berkeley, California, the youngest child of George Andrew Dodge, a San Francisco architect, and Maude Ellingwood Bennett Dodge. Following George's death in an automobile accident, Maude "Monnie" Dodge moved the family (David and his three older sisters, Kathryn, Frances, and Marian) to Southern California, where David attended Lincoln High School in Los Angeles but did not graduate.

After leaving school, he worked as a bank messenger, a marine fireman, a stevedore, and a night watchman. In 1934, he went to work for the San Francisco accounting firm of McLaren, Goode & Company, becoming a Certified Public Accountant in 1937. On July 17, 1936, he was married to Elva Keith, a former Macmillan Company editorial representative, and their only daughter, Kendal, was born in 1940. After the attack on Pearl Harbor he joined the U.S. Naval Reserve, emerging three years later with the rank of Lieutenant Commander.

David Dodge's first experience as a writer came through his involvement with the Macondray Lane Players, a group of amateur playwrights, producers, and actors whose goal was to create a theater purely for pleasure. The group was founded by George Henry Burkhardt (Dodge's brother-in-law) and performed exclusively at Macondria, a small theater located in the basement of Burkhardt's house at 56 Macondray Lane on San Francisco's Russian Hill. His publishing career began in 1936 when he won First Prize in the Northern California Drama Association's Third Annual One Act Play Tournament. The prize-winning play, "A Certain Man Had Two Sons," was subsequently published by the Banner Play Bureau, of San Francisco. Another Dodge play, "Christmas Eve at the Mermaid," co-written by Loyall McLaren (his boss at McLaren, Goode & Co.), was performed as the Bohemian Club's Christmas play of 1940, and again in 1959. In 1961, the Grabhorn Press published the play in a volume entitled Shakespeare in Bohemia.

His career as a writer really began, however, when he made a bet with his wife that he could write a better mystery novel than the ones they were reading during a rainy family vacation. He drew on his professional experience as a CPA and wrote his first novel, Death and Taxes, featuring San Francisco tax expert and reluctant detective James "Whit" Whitney. It was published by Macmillan in 1941 and he won five dollars from Elva. Three more Whitney novels soon followed: Shear the Black Sheep (Macmillan, 1942), Bullets for the Bridegroom (Macmillan, 1944) and It Ain't Hay (Simon & Schuster, 1946), in which Whit tangles with marijuana smugglers. With its subject matter and extremely evocative cover art on both the first edition dust jacket and the paperback reprint, this book remains one of Dodge's most collectible titles.

Upon his release from active duty by the Navy in 1945, Dodge left San Francisco and set out for Guatemala by car with his wife and daughter, beginning his second career as a travel writer. The Dodge family's misadventures on the road through Mexico are hilariously documented in How Green Was My Father (Simon & Schuster, 1947). His Latin American experiences also produced a second series character, expatriate private investigator and tough-guy adventurer Al Colby, who first appears in The Long Escape (Random House, 1948).

After two more well-received Colby books in 1949 and 1950, Dodge abandoned series characters and focused on stand-alone suspense adventures set in exotic locales around the world; To Catch a Thief was Dodge's greatest career success, primarily due to the fact the Alfred Hitchcock purchased film rights before the novel was even published in 1952 and turned it into the 1955 Paramount film starring Cary Grant and Grace Kelly.

For the remainder of his career, Dodge alternated between mystery and travel writing, continuing the saga of the Dodge family as they bumble and bargain their way around the world. The Poor Man’s Guide to Europe, a "tipsheet for nickel-nursers and skinflints" appeared in 1953 and was so successful that Random House issued annual revised editions from 1954 to 1959. It was also a Book-of-the-Month Club selection. Although this book was a more traditional—and practical—travel book, it too was liberally sprinkled with anecdotes of the Dodge family's personal experiences. He also wrote numerous travel articles for various magazines, appearing as a regular contributor to Holiday magazine from 1948 to 1968.

In 1968, David and Elva settled in San Miguel de Allende, Mexico. Elva died on October 17, 1973. David died less than a year later on August 8, 1974. They are both buried in San Miguel.

Although a writer by profession, Dodge's true love was travel. He was fond of explaining that while many writers traveled in order to gather material to write about, his goal was to write in order to gather money to travel.

In 2005, Hard Case Crime reprinted Dodge's second Al Colby novel, Plunder of the Sun, and in 2006 published his last completed novel, The Last Match. The manuscript, which remained unsold at the time of his death, was discovered among his papers.

Bruin Books reprinted Death and Taxes and To Catch a Thief in 2010, The Long Escape in 2011, and Carambola in 2016.

== Bibliography ==
=== Whit Whitney novels ===
- Death and Taxes (1941)
- Shear the Black Sheep (1942)
- Bullets for the Bridegroom (1944)
- It Ain't Hay (1946)
  - aka A Drug on the Market

=== Al Colby novels ===
- The Long Escape (1948)
- Plunder of the Sun (1949)
- The Red Tassel (1950)

=== Other novels ===
- To Catch a Thief (1952)
- The Lights of Skaro (1954)
- Angel's Ransom (1956)
  - aka Ransom of the Angel
- Loo Loo's Legacy (1960)
- Carambola (1961)
  - aka High Corniche
- Hooligan (1969)
  - aka Hatchetman
- Troubleshooter (1971)
- The Last Match (2006)

=== Travel books ===
- How Green Was My Father, illustrated by Irv Koons (1947)
- How Lost Was My Weekend, illustrated by Irv Koons (1948)
- The Crazy Glasspecker, illustrated by Irv Koons (1949)
  - aka High Life in the Andes
- 20,000 Leagues Behind the 8-Ball, illustrated by Irv Koons (1951)
  - aka With a Knife and Fork Down the Amazon
- The Poor Man's Guide to Europe, illustrated by Irv Koons (1953)
- Time Out for Turkey (1955)
  - aka Talking Turkey
- The Rich Man's Guide to the Riviera (1962)
- The Poor Man's Guide to the Orient, illustrated by Carl Rose (1965)
- Fly Down, Drive Mexico (1968)
  - aka The Best of Mexico by Car

== Radio adaptations ==
- "Plunder of the Sun." Escape (E96, November 8, 1949)
- "To Catch A Thief." The Saturday Play, BBC Radio 4 (January 8, 2011)

== Filmography ==
- Plunder of the Sun (1953, Warner Bros.)
- To Catch a Thief (1955, Paramount)
- The Kaiser Aluminum Hour: "Angel's Ransom" (S1.E8, October 23, 1956)

== Read ==
- "Excerpt from Plunder of the Sun". HardCaseCrime.com.
- "Excerpt from The Last Match". HardCaseCrime.com.
