= Plunder of the Sun =

1953 film by John Farrow

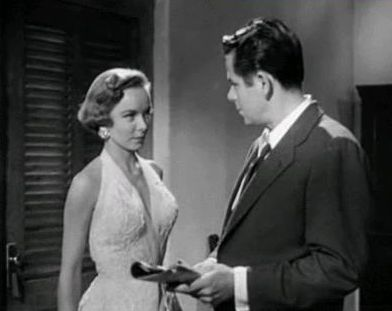
- Diana Lynn and Glenn Ford in the film
- Directed by: John Farrow
- Written by: David Dodge (novel); Jonathan Latimer (screenplay)
- Produced by: Robert Fellows
- Starring: Glenn Ford; Diana Lynn; Patricia Medina; Francis L. Sullivan
- Cinematography: Jack Draper
- Edited by: Harry Marker
- Music by: Antonio Díaz Conde
- Production company: Wayne-Fellows Productions
- Distributed by: Warner Bros. Pictures
- Release date: August 26, 1953 (New York City)
- Running time: 82 minutes
- Country: United States
- Language: English
- Box office: $1 million (US)

Plunder of the Sun is a 1949 novel written by David Dodge about the hunt for ancient Peruvian treasure. It was adapted for the November 8, 1949 episode of the radio series Escape and later into the 1953 film noir of the same title, starring Glenn Ford and with the location changed from Peru to Mexico.

== Plot ==
Adventurer Al Colby is persuaded by Anna Luz and her antiquities-collector husband Thomas Berrien to help them smuggle a parcel into Mexico where its true value can be ascertained. Warned that a man named Jefferson, who is traveling on the same freighter, might try to steal the parcel, Colby forms a partnership with Jefferson following Berrien's fatal heart attack aboard the ship. Jefferson betrays and shoots Colby, but Colby saves himself and the rare documents in time. They will be returned to a museum while he and Anna can enjoy a $25,000 reward.

== Cast ==
- Glenn Ford as Al Colby
- Diana Lynn as Julie Barnes
- Patricia Medina as Anna Luz
- Francis L. Sullivan as Thomas Berrien
- Sean McClory as Jefferson
- Eduardo Noriega as Raul Cornejo
- Julio Villarreal as Ulbaldo Navarro
- Charles Rooner as Captain Bergman
- Douglass Dumbrille as Consul

== Gallery ==
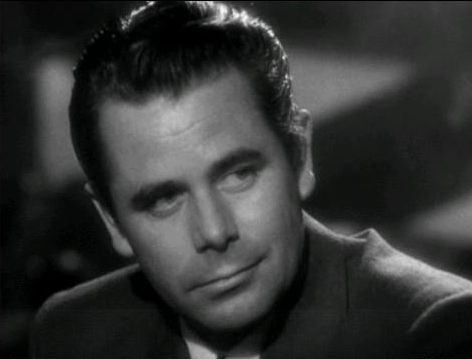
Glenn Ford

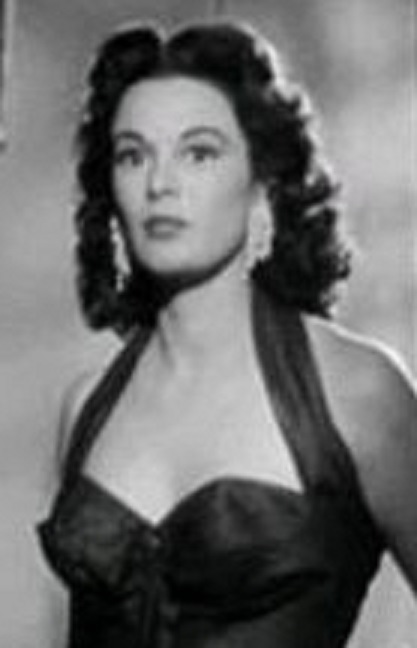
Patricia Medina

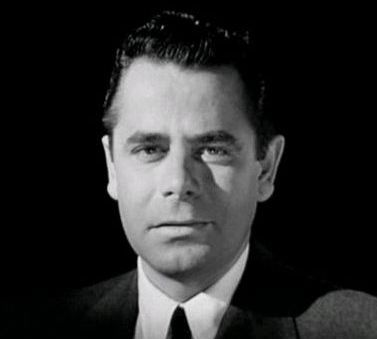
Glenn Ford
