= Theodore Roosevelt Monument =

- U.S. National Register of Historic Places
- New Jersey Register of Historic Places
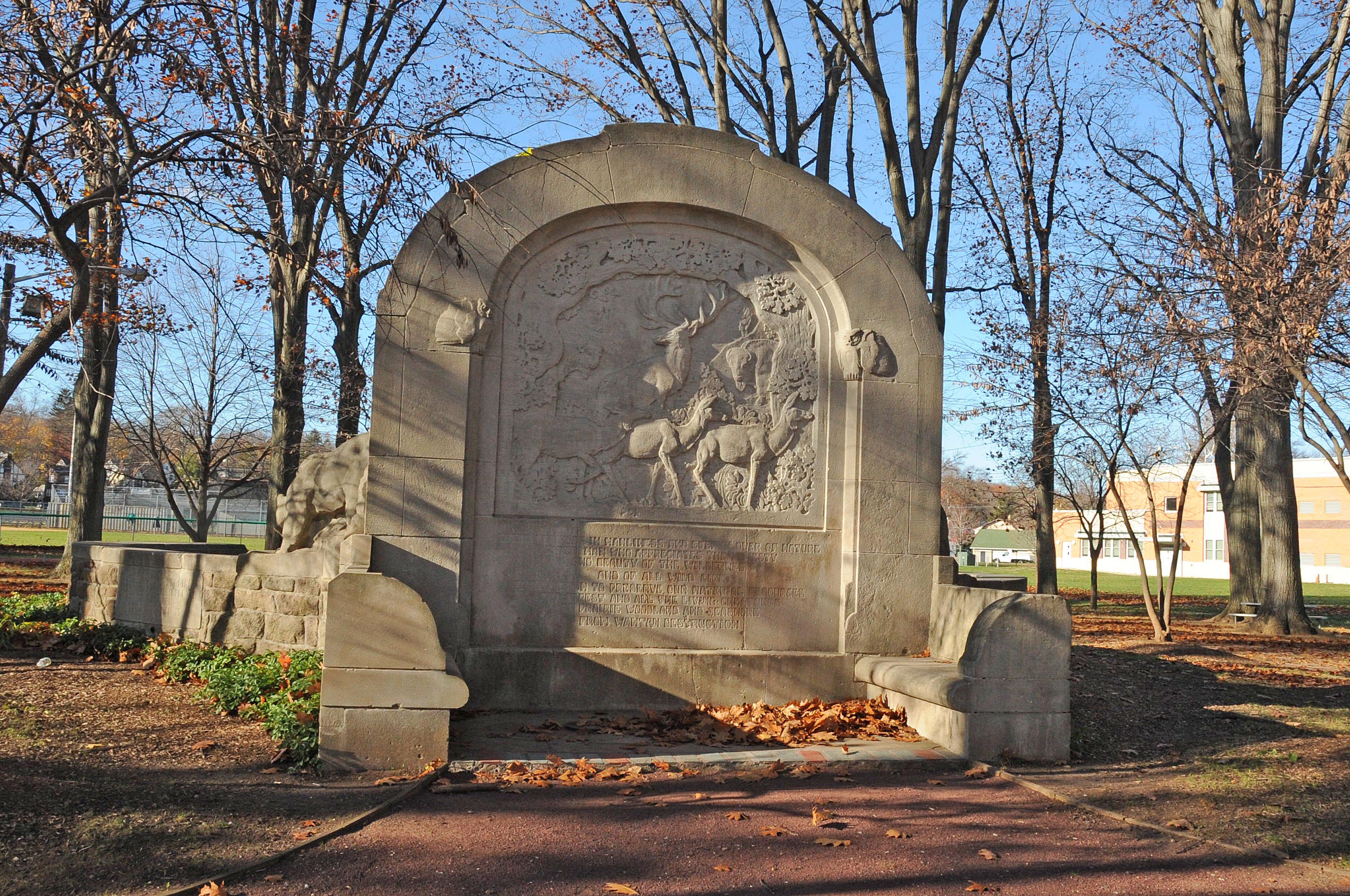

- Location within Bergen County, New Jersey Location within New Jersey Location within the United States
- Location: Roosevelt Common, Riveredge Road, Tenafly, New Jersey
- Coordinates: 40°55′42″N 73°58′7″W
- Area: less than one acre
- Built: 1928
- Architects: Hammer, Trygve; Cautley, Marjorie Sewell, et al.
- NRHP reference No.: 06000870
- NJRHP No.: 76

Significant dates
- Added to NRHP: September 20, 2006
- Designated NJRHP: August 3, 2006

The Theodore Roosevelt Monument is located in Tenafly, Bergen County, New Jersey, United States. Constructed in 1928, the monument was added to the National Register of Historic Places on September 20, 2006.

== See also ==
- Presidential memorials in the United States
- National Register of Historic Places listings in Bergen County, New Jersey
