= Tenafly Nature Center =

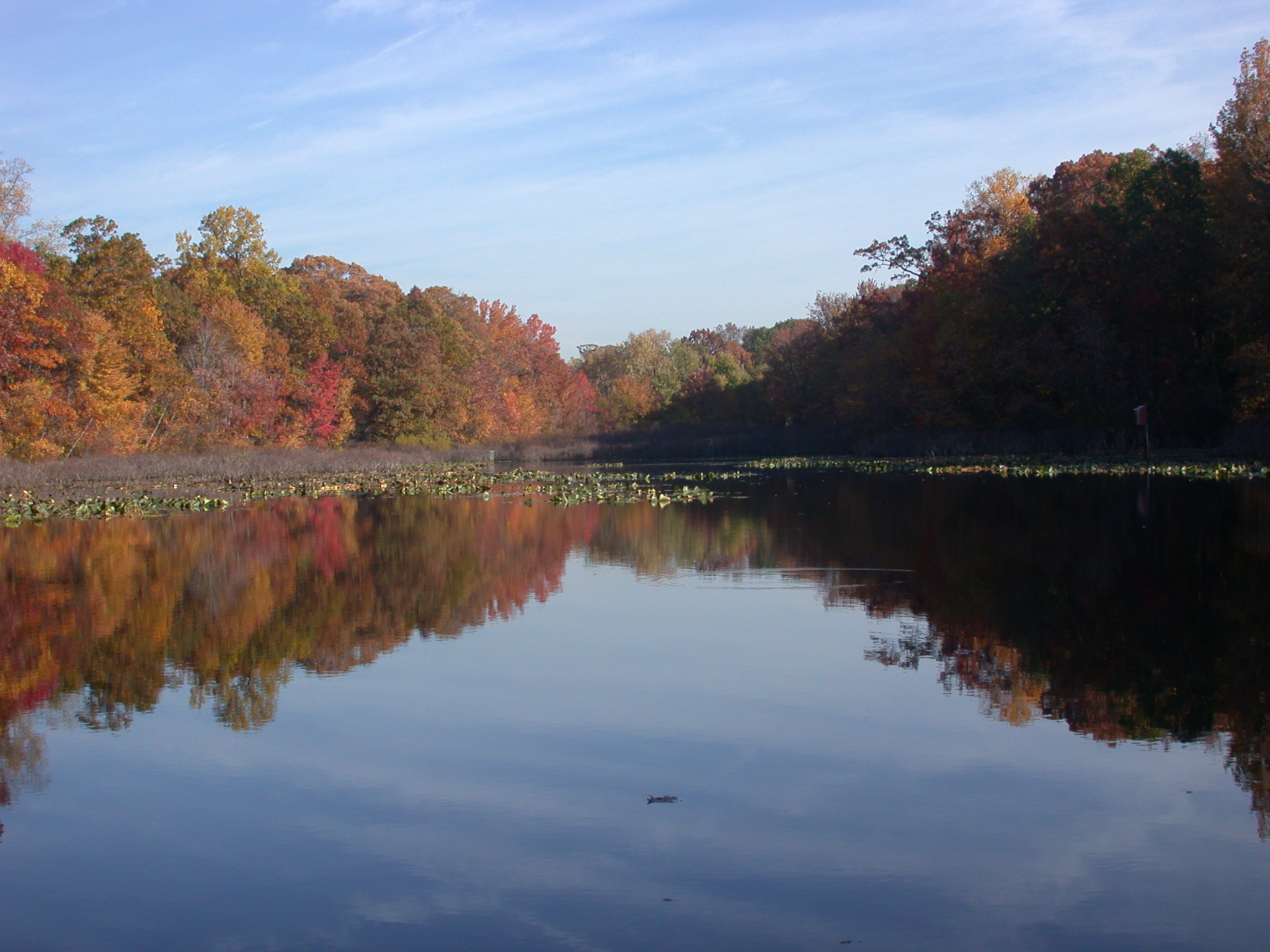
- Pfister's Pond in autumn

- Location within Bergen County, New Jersey
- Location: 313 Hudson Avenue, Tenafly, NJ, USA
- Coordinates: 40°55′31″N 73°56′45″W
- Area: 380 acres (1.5 km^{2})
- Website: tenaflynaturecenter.org

The Tenafly Nature Center is a 52-acre nature preserve in Tenafly, New Jersey. It is operated by a non-profit organization, the Tenafly Nature Center Association. Adjacent to it is the 330-acre Lost Brook Preserve, which is owned by the city.

At the center of the preserve is a 3-acre pond known as Pfister's Pond, home to several species of frogs and turtles. In total, the preserve houses roughly 50 distinct species of bird, 23 species of mammal, and 24 species of amphibians and reptiles.
