= Clifford Demarest =

American composer

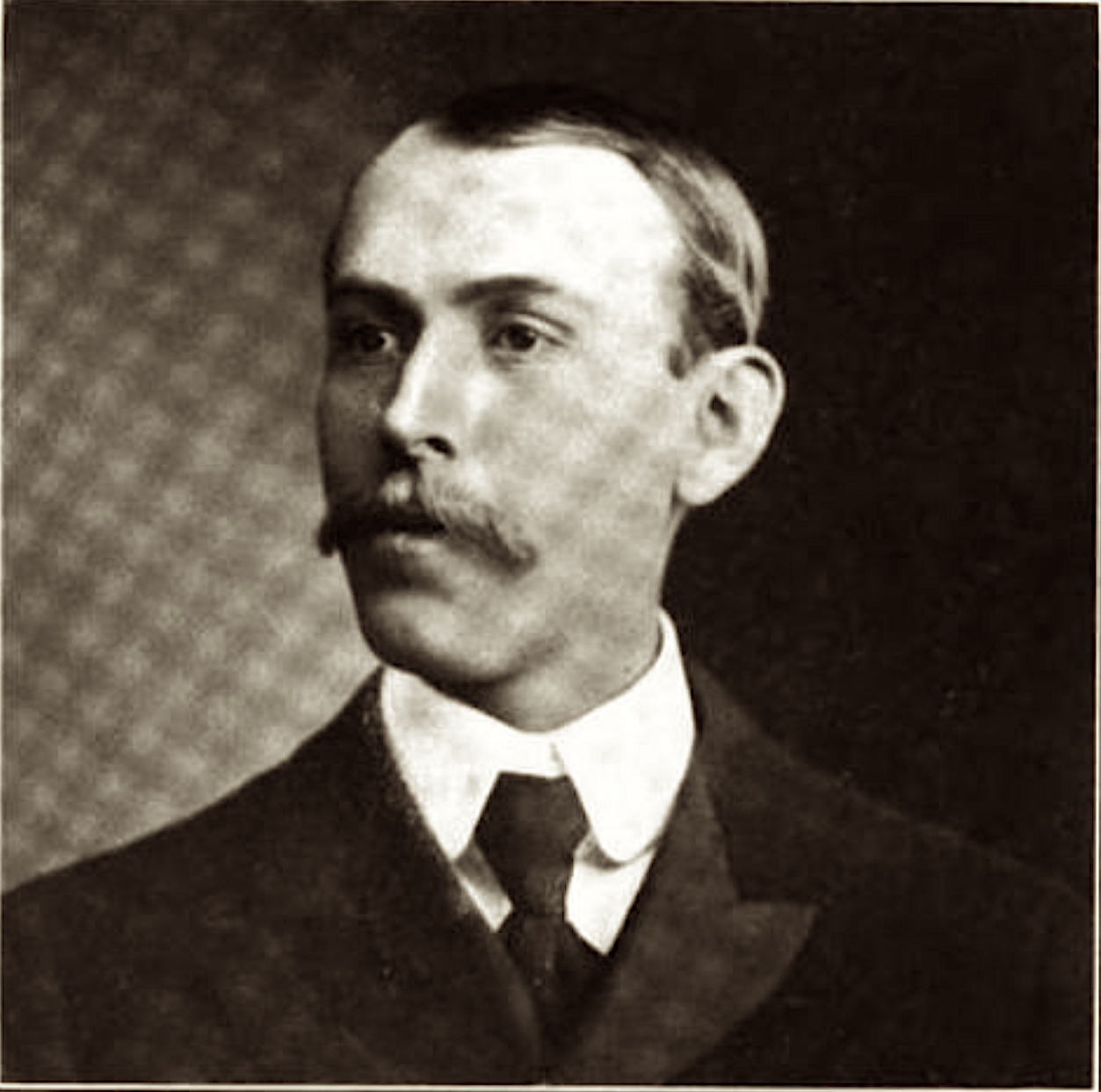
- Born: Clifford Demarest; August 12, 1874; Tenafly, New Jersey
- Died: May 13, 1946 (aged 71); Tenafly, New Jersey
- Occupations: Composer, organist
- Known for: He wrote a number of anthems, songs, and part-songs
- Spouse(s): Josephine Maugham; Annie Maugham
- Children: Josephine Demarest; Kathryn Demarest; Beaumont Demarest

Clifford Demarest (August 12, 1874 – May 13, 1946) was an American composer and organist. He wrote a number of anthems, songs, and part-songs, as well as some pieces for piano and for organ. He was early leader of the American Guild of Organists, and from 1911 until his death he served as organist at Church of the Messiah (New York City).

== Biography ==
Clifford Demarest was born in Tenafly, New Jersey, which remained his home for his entire life. His father, a successful businessman, ran a general store; his mother was a capable musician who played the organ at the local Presbyterian Church. Demarest learned music first from her, later studying with the organist R. Huntington Woodman at the Metropolitan College of Music, New York. On October 12, 1898, Demarest married Josephine Maugham (b. 1873); the couple had three children before Josephine died in 1912. Demarest then married Annie Maugham, Josephine's twin sister; Annie died in 1934.

== Career ==
In 1901 Demarest was appointed organist and choir director at the Reformed Church on the Heights, Brooklyn. The following year he passed the examination to become a Fellow of the American Guild of Organists, and he played a central role in that organization for two decades. For ten years he also dabbled in business ventures with members of his family; but in 1911 he became organist at the Church of the Messiah, New York, and thereafter concentrated solely on music. The minister, John Haynes Holmes, was a progressive reformer and pacifist who became a close personal friend and who helped shape Demarest's interest in education, reform, and musical communities. From about 1915 Demarest began playing recitals and touring on behalf of the A. G. O. In 1919 fire destroyed the Church of the Messiah, and Demarest became music supervisor at Tenafly High School. He returned to be organist at the church after it was rebuilt, but he also continued teaching until 1937. He played at the church until his death.

== Music ==
Demarest composed almost exclusively for the church, producing music for organ and for solo and ensemble voices. He copyrighted a steady stream of music from 1899 forwards, averaging about four or five pieces per year, though his productivity declined after 1927. His primary publishers were G. Schirmer and Arthur P. Schmidt. He was musically conservative as both player and composer, preferring music that directly addressed the needs and tastes of churchgoers and listeners and rejecting theatrical performances characterised by novel effects. His brief treatise on organ playing is a model of practicality. But he was versatile and open-minded, incorporating idioms from popular music into several extended compositions for piano and organ. He worked closely with John Haynes Holmes, and one of his most ambitious and successful pieces, "America Triumphant," set Holmes's poetry. Holmes was a strong supporter of the Harlem Renaissance, and Demarest followed his lead by introducing spirituals and other music of African Americans into services at the church. Demarest was not an innovator, but he provided a steadying hand in leading his profession, true service to communities in his church and elsewhere, and a body of music that was highly regarded by his peers.
