= Lyn Murray =

English-born American composer

- Born: Lionel Breeze; 13 August 1909; London, England
- Died: 20 May 1989 (aged 79) Los Angeles, California
- Occupation: American film composer

Lyn Murray (born Lionel Breeze, August 13, 1909 – May 20, 1989) was a composer, conductor, and arranger of music for radio, film and television.

== Early years ==
Born in London, Murray was the son of a violinist. Before entering a career in music, Murray was a seaman. He followed that nautical occupation with a stint as a reporter with the Philadelphia Public Ledger. He also attended the Juilliard School.

== Radio ==
Murray's initial involvement with radio came in Newport News, Virginia. From 1931 to 1937, he was staff conductor and arranger at WCAU in Philadelphia, Pennsylvania. From there, he went to CBS, where he conducted, arranged, and composed music from 1934 to 1947.

He later founded the Lyn Murray Singers, who became known throughout the United States as the featured group on CBS Radio's Your Hit Parade.

In the early 1940s, Murray, his orchestra and chorus were featured on Meet the Music, "a Sunday evening feature paying weekly tribute to the modern song writers." Beginning in 1943, he led a 20-piece orchestra and 12-member singing group on To Your Good Health, broadcast three times a week on CBS radio.

His other work in radio included composing for The Adventures of Ellery Queen and being choral director for Pursuit of Happiness. He was also music conductor for Radio Reader's Digest.

== Television ==
Murray worked as a conductor, arranger and producer with such artists as Bing Crosby, Louis Armstrong and Burl Ives at CBS prior to moving to NBC in 1947. The Lyn Murray Singers appeared on Broadway in Finian's Rainbow (1948), singing arrangements written by Murray for the production. He composed the incidental music for 35 episodes of The Alfred Hitchcock Hour between 1962 and 1965 and for 46 episodes of Dragnet 1967 between 1967 and 1969.

== Film ==
In 1950, Murray moved to Hollywood and provided vocal arrangements for Walt Disney's 1950 film Cinderella and began composing scores for feature films, including The Prowler (1951), To Catch a Thief (1955), D-Day the Sixth of June (1956), Escape from Zahrain (1962), Come Fly with Me (1963), Wives and Lovers (1963), Promise Her Anything (1965), Rosie! (1967), Strategy of Terror (1969), The Cockeyed Cowboys of Calico County (1970) and Love Hate Love (1971), as well as creating episodic underscoring for television shows such as The Virginian (1962), Daniel Boone (1964), The Time Tunnel (1966), Dragnet (1967), and the unaired pilot for Mr. Terrific.

== Stage ==
Arranging choral music for This Is the Army was Murray's first Broadway experience. He went on to do vocal arrangements for Swingin' the Dream (1939), Panama Hattie (1940–1942), Let's Face It! (1941–1943), and Finian's Rainbow (1947–1948; 2009–2010).

== Recognition ==
Murray won an Emmy Award in 1986 for his score to the National Geographic special Miraculous Machines.

== Family ==
Murray was married for a time to Carol Irwin in 1940, then to Tina Gray in 1950, and then to fashion historian Margaret Pexton but they divorced in 1982.

== Death ==
Murray lived for many years in Pacific Palisades, California, and died of cancer at Cedars-Sinai Medical Center in Los Angeles, aged 79.
