= Westervelt House =

Historic house in New Jersey, United States

- U.S. National Register of Historic Places
- New Jersey Register of Historic Places
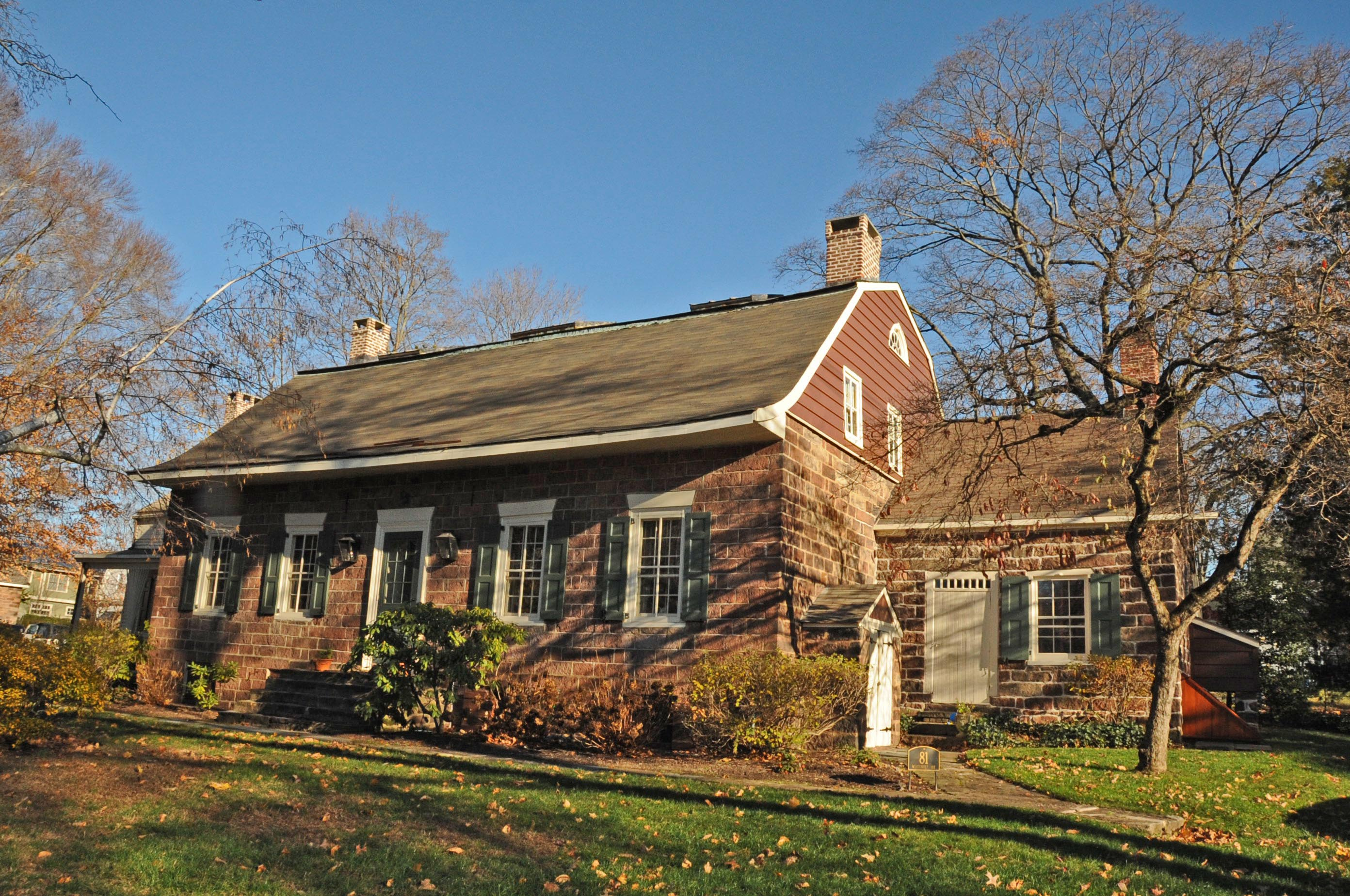
- Westervelt House in 2015.

- Location within Bergen County, New Jersey Location within New Jersey Location within the United States
- Location: 81 Westervelt Avenue, Tenafly, New Jersey
- Coordinates: 40°55′17″N 73°58′8″W
- Area: less than one acre
- Built: 1745
- MPS: Stone Houses of Bergen County TR
- NRHP reference No.: 83001586
- NJRHP No.: 708

Significant dates
- Added to NRHP: August 15, 1983
- Designated NJRHP: October 3, 1980

Westervelt House is located in Tenafly, Bergen County, New Jersey, United States. The south wing of the house was built in 1745 by Roelof Westervelt whose grandfather purchased the property in 1695. The central section of the house was added in 1798 and later in 1825 the north wing was added. Ownership of the house remained in the hands of the Westervelt family until 1923. It serves as the oldest standing building in Tenafly. The house was added to the National Register of Historic Places on August 15, 1983.

== See also ==
- National Register of Historic Places listings in Bergen County, New Jersey
