= Caren Turner =

American lobbyist

- Born: 1957 (age 68–69)
- Education: Brandeis University (B.A.); Georgetown Law (J.D.); Rutgers University (MBA)
- Occupations: CEO of Turner Government & Public Affairs
- Political party: Democratic
- Spouse: Henry Fishman (m. 1984 div. unknown)
- Children: 2

Caren Zeldie Turner (born 1957) is an American lawyer and lobbyist. She formerly served as commissioner for the Port Authority of New York and New Jersey. Her involvement in a 2018 traffic stop in Tenafly, New Jersey went viral on YouTube.

== Early life and education ==
Originally from New Jersey, Caren Turner was born in 1957 to Bernard and Joyce Turner. Her father was an attorney who served on the Board of Education in Cresskill, New Jersey, and her mother was an editor at Prentice Hall.

Turner received a bachelor's degree cum laude from Brandeis University where she majored in both political science and Spanish and a juris doctor from Georgetown Law, where she served as an editor of the school's Law and Policy in International Business law journal. She also received an executive MBA from Rutgers University.

== Career ==
Turner is a political consultant and the founder and CEO of Turner Government & Public Affairs, a government affairs firm. As a political consultant she has worked for companies that manufacture parts for Lockheed Martin fighter jets. She was an attorney with Potomac Law Group and a former adjunct professor at George Washington University’s Graduate School of Political Management.

=== Media ===
Turner has been featured on Fox Business as a correspondent on Washington lobbying, and wrote articles for The Huffington Post. She has appeared on television channels such as Fox Business Network as a government lobbying expert.

=== Political activism ===
Turner served on the finance committees for Jon Corzine and Hillary Clinton. She was a co-chair of the Financial Committee for Ready for Hillary, a super political action committee created to draft Clinton for the 2016 United States Presidential Election.

=== Port Authority board of commissioners ===
In March 2017, Turner began a six-year unpaid term on the Board of Commissioners of the Port Authority of New York and New Jersey, after New Jersey Senate Majority Leader Loretta Weinberg recommended her, Governor Chris Christie nominated her, and the New Jersey State Senate approved.

=== Controversy ===
Turner resigned from the Port Authority and was fined $1500 by the Ethics Commission after she injected herself into a traffic stop in March 2018. Police in Tenafly, New Jersey had stopped a vehicle carrying several people, including Turner's adult daughter; finding that the car's registration had expired and that the driver could produce no proof of insurance, they moved to impound it. Turner arrived soon after and repeatedly demanded that the officers explain to her the reason for the stop. She said she was a "friend of the mayor", told the officers to address her as "Commissioner", complained that they had ruined the holidays of "Ph.D. students from MIT and Yale", and told one of the officers to "shut the fuck up".

Video from the police cruiser's dashcam appeared on YouTube, and the incident was nationally reported by CBS News, CNBC, and The New York Times, among others. Turner resigned, then issued an apology in which she denied asking for special treatment for her daughter and her daughter's friends; a Port Authority representative replied that "the video speaks for itself, [her] conduct was indefensible". At the time of Turner's resignation, the Authority was preparing to take action against her at a board meeting.

== Personal life ==
Turner has one sibling, a brother. She is divorced from Henry Fishman, a physician and host of the Associated Press Radio Network program Health and Medicine. She previously served on the Georgetown Law Alumni Board.
