= Tenafly, New Jersey =

Borough in Bergen County, New Jersey, US

- Borough
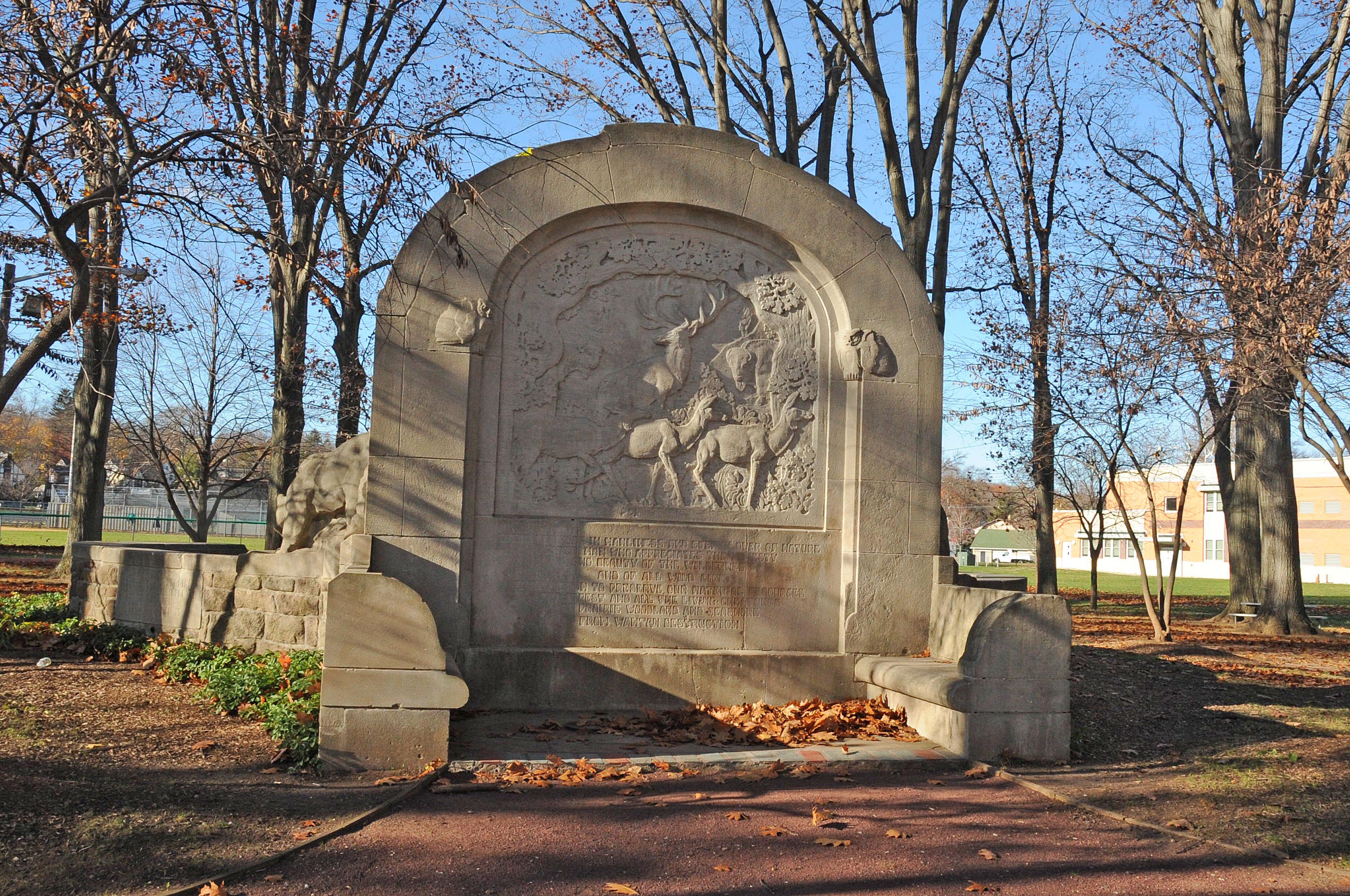

- Seal

- Location of Tenafly in Bergen County highlighted in red (left). Inset map: Location of Bergen County in New Jersey highlighted in orange (right).

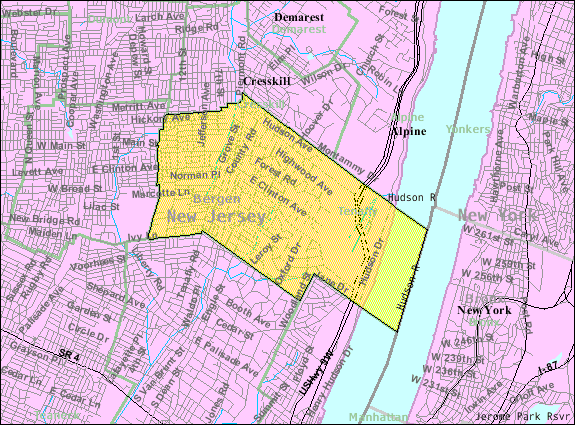
- Census Bureau map of Tenafly, New Jersey

- Location in Bergen County Location in New Jersey Location in the United States
- Coordinates: 40.918309°N 73.950523°W
- Country: United States
- State: New Jersey
- County: Bergen
- Incorporated: January 24, 1894

Government
  - Type: Special charter
  - Body: Borough Council
  - Mayor: Mark Zinna (D)
  - Borough Administrator: David Fanslau
  - Borough Clerk: Omar Stovall

Area
  - Total: 5.17 sq mi (13.38 km^{2})
  - Land: 4.59 sq mi (11.88 km^{2})
  - Water: 0.58 sq mi (1.50 km^{2}) 11.20%
  - Rank: 273rd of 565 in state 12th of 70 in county
- Elevation: 217 ft (66 m)

Population (2020)
  - Total: 15,409
  - Estimate (2023): 15,178
  - Rank: 169th of 565 in state 21st of 70 in county
  - Density: 3,360/sq mi (1,300/km^{2})
  - Rank: 201st of 565 in state 42nd of 70 in county
- Time zone: UTC−05:00 (Eastern (EST))
  - Summer (DST): UTC−04:00 (Eastern (EDT))
- ZIP Code: 07670
- Area code: 201
- FIPS code: 3400272420
- GNIS feature ID: 0885417
- Website: www.tenaflynj.gov

Tenafly (/ˈtɛnəflaɪ/) is a borough in Bergen County, in the U.S. state of New Jersey. As of the 2020 United States census, the borough's population was 15,409, an increase of 6.4% from the 2010 census. Tenafly is a suburb of New York City.

The borough has been one of the state's highest-income communities. Based on data from the American Community Survey for 2013–2017, Tenafly residents had a median household income of $153,381, ranked 13th in the state among municipalities with more than 10,000 residents, more than double the statewide median of $76,475.

Tenafly was incorporated as a borough on January 24, 1894, by an act of the New Jersey Legislature from portions of the now-defunct Palisades Township, based on the results of a referendum held the previous day. The borough was the first formed during the "Boroughitis" phenomenon then sweeping through Bergen County, in which 26 boroughs were formed in the county in 1894 alone. Portions of Palisades Township were acquired based on legislation approved on April 8, 1897.

== History ==
The first European settlers in Tenafly were Dutch immigrants, who began to populate the area during the late 17th century. The name "Tenafly" is of Dutch language origin. Some historical references cite a Dutch language connection to its location on or at "a meadow". Other derivations cite the early-modern Dutch phrase "Tiene Vly" or "Ten Swamps" which was given by Dutch settlers in 1688.

== Geography ==
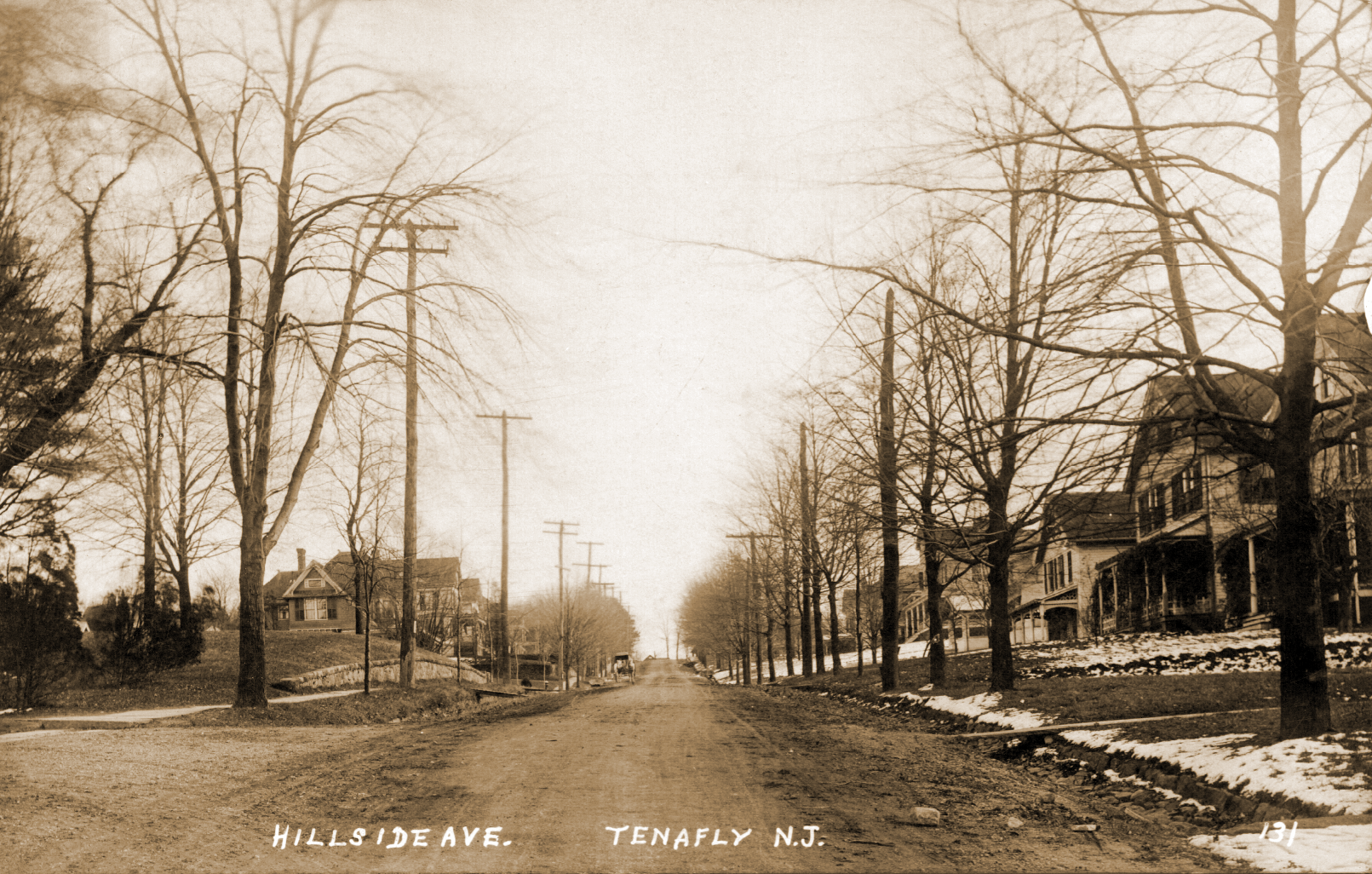
Hillside Avenue, c. 1913–1916

According to the United States Census Bureau, the borough had a total area of 5.16 square miles (13.38 km^{2}), including 4.59 sq mi (11.88 km^{2}) of land and 0.58 sq mi (1.50 km^{2}) of water (11.20%).

The borough borders the municipalities of Alpine, Bergenfield, Cresskill, Englewood and Englewood Cliffs in Bergen County, as well as The Bronx in New York City across the Hudson River.

Tenafly's street plan and overall development were largely determined by its hills and valleys. The eastern part of the borough is referred to as the "East Hill" for its higher elevation in relation to the rest of the borough. There, the terrain rises dramatically to the east of the downtown area, terminating at the New Jersey Palisades, overlooking the Hudson River. Nearby is the Tenafly Nature Center, located at 313 Hudson Avenue.

== Demographics ==
Historical population
Census	Pop.	Note	%±
1880	1,019		—
1890	1,046		2.6%
1900	1,746		66.9%
1910	2,756		57.8%
1920	3,585		30.1%
1930	5,669		58.1%
1940	7,413		30.8%
1950	9,651		30.2%
1960	14,264		47.8%
1970	14,827		3.9%
1980	13,552		−8.6%
1990	13,326		−1.7%
2000	13,806		3.6%
2010	14,488		4.9%
2020	15,409		6.4%
2023 (est.)	15,178	▼	−1.5%
Population sources: 1880–1890; 1890–1920 1890–1910; 1910–1930 1900–2020; 2000 2010 2020

=== Racial and ethnic composition ===
Tenafly borough, New Jersey – Racial and ethnic composition Note: the US Census treats Hispanic/Latino as an ethnic category. This table excludes Latinos from the racial categories and assigns them to a separate category. Hispanics/Latinos may be of any race.
Race / Ethnicity (NH = Non-Hispanic)	Pop 2000	Pop 2010	Pop 2020	% 2000	% 2010	% 2020
White alone (NH)	10,176	9,475	8,719	73.71%	65.40%	56.58%
Black or African American alone (NH)	122	123	240	0.88%	0.85%	1.56%
Native American or Alaska Native alone (NH)	8	2	8	0.06%	0.01%	0.05%
Asian alone (NH)	2,629	3,794	4,711	19.04%	26.19%	30.57%
Native Hawaiian or Pacific Islander alone (NH)	3	0	12	0.02%	0.00%	0.08%
Other race alone (NH)	29	42	87	0.21%	0.29%	0.56%
Mixed race or Multiracial (NH)	197	276	495	1.43%	1.91%	3.21%
Hispanic or Latino (any race)	642	776	1,137	4.65%	5.36%	7.38%
Total	13,806	14,488	15,409	100.00%	100.00%	100.00%

=== 2020 census ===
As of the 2020 census, Tenafly had a population of 15,409. The median age was 42.6 years; 29.5% of the residents were under 18 and 14.8% were 65 or older. The female/male ratio was 1:0.954 overall and 1:0.905 for 18 and over.

All of the residents lived in urban areas, while none lived in rural areas.

Of the 4,913 households in Tenafly, 48.9% had children under 18 living in them, 70.3% were married-couple households, 9.3% were households with a male householder and no spouse or partner present, and 18.8% were households with a female householder and no spouse or partner present. About 15.1% of all households were made up of individuals, and 8.8% had someone living alone who was 65 or older.

The borough had 5,184 housing units, of which 5.2% were vacant. The homeowner vacancy rate was 1.6% and the rental vacancy rate was 5.8%.

=== 2010 census ===
The 2010 United States census counted 14,488 people, 4,766 households, and 3,956 families in the borough. The population density was 3,148.6 per square mile (1,215.7/km^{2}). The 4,980 housing units had an average density of 1,082.3 per square mile (417.9/km^{2}). The racial makeup was 69.31% White, 0.88% Black or African American, 0.03% Native American, 26.22% Asian, 1.23% from other races, and 2.33% from two or more races. Hispanisc or Latinos of any race were 5.36% of the population. Korean Americans accounted for 15.4% of the population in 2010.

Of the 4,766 households, 49.1% had children under 18, 72.7% were married couples living together, 8.2% had a female householder with no husband present, and 17.0% were not families. About 15.3% were made up of individuals and 8.7% had someone living alone who was 65 or older. The average household size was 3.02, and the average family size was 3.36.

The age distribution was 31.2% under 18, 5.0% from 18 to 24, 20.2% from 25 to 44, 30.2% from 45 to 64, and 13.5% who were 65 or older. The median age was 41.8 years. For every 100 females, the population had 93.4 males. For every 100 females 18 and older, there were 87.6 males.

=== 2000 census ===
As of the 2000 United States census 13,806 people, 4,774 households, and 3,866 families resided in the borough. The population density was 2,993.4 inhabitants per square mile (1,155.8/km^{2}). The 4,897 housing units had an average density of 1,061.8 per square mile (410.0/km^{2}). The racial makeup of the borough was 76.79% White, 0.96% African American, 0.09% Native American, 19.08% Asian, 0.02% Pacific Islander, 1.40% from other races, and 1.67% from two or more races. Hispanics or Latinos of any race were 4.65% of the population. In ancestry, 11.1% of residents were of Irish, 8.7% Russian, 8.6% Italian, 7.9% American, 7.8% German and 6.2% Polish descent according to Census 2000. Among residents, 64.0% spoke English at home, while 8.7% spoke Korean, 5.0% Spanish, 4.5% Chinese or Mandarin and 3.1% Hebrew.

Of the 4,774 households, 43.9% had children under 18 living with them, 70.6% were married couples living together, 8.1% had a female householder with no husband present and 19.0% were not families. About 16.8% of all households were made up of individuals, and 9.3% had someone living alone who was 65 or older. The average household size was 2.86, and the average family size was 3.21.

In the borough the age distribution was 28.3% under 18, 4.7% from 18 to 24, 25.4% from 25 to 44, 26.4% from 45 to 64, and 15.2% who were 65 or older. The median age was 41 years. For every 100 females, there were 92.9 males. For every 100 females 18 and over, there were 87.5 males.

=== Income and poverty ===
Based on data from the Census Bureau's American Community Survey for 2013–2017, Tenafly residents' median household income had increased substantially from the 2006–2010 survey, reaching $153,381, ranked 13th in the state among municipalities with more than 10,000 residents, more than double the statewide median of $76,475.

The 2006–2010 Survey showed that (in 2010 inflation-adjusted dollars) median household income was $125,865 (with a margin of error of +/− $23,612) and the median family income was $140,100 (+/− $26,372). Males had a median income of $102,645 (+/− $7,373) versus $60,871 (+/− $9,308) for females. The per capita income for the borough was $60,557 (+/− $5,176). About 1.8% of families and 2.9% of the population were below the poverty line, including 1.4% of those under 18 and 2.2% of those 65 or over.

== Government ==
=== Local government ===
Tenafly is governed under a special charter granted by the New Jersey Legislature. This charter retains most aspects of the borough form of government, with the addition of initiative, referendum, and recall features. The borough is one of 11 municipalities (of the 564) statewide that use a state-granted special charter. The governing body is composed of a mayor and a borough council, with all positions elected at-large on a partisan basis as part of the November general election. A mayor is elected directly by the voters to a four-year term of office and is eligible for re-election. The borough council includes six members elected to serve three-year terms on a staggered basis, with two seats coming up for election each year in a three-year cycle. As the legislative body, the borough council adopts ordinances and resolutions, decides on appropriations, approves appointments made by the mayor, determines policy and establishes the functions of the various departments of the local government. Each council member is chairperson of one of six standing committees. The mayor presides over council meetings, but only votes in case of a tie and can cast a veto which can be overridden by a two-thirds vote of the council.

As of 2025, the mayor of Tenafly is Democrat Mark Zinna, whose term ends on December 31, 2027. Members of the Tenafly Borough Council are Daniel Park (D, 2025), Adam Michaels (D, 2025), Jaime Corsair (D, 2026), John Roglieri (D, 2026), Julie O'Connor (D, 2027) and Lauren Dayton (D, 2027).

In January 2020, the borough council appointed Julie O'Connor to fill the remainder of the term expiring in December 2021 that had been held by Mark Zinna until he stepped down earlier that month to take office as mayor.

In 2000, the local government of Tenafly sought to ban the erection of eruvs in their community. The eruv association filed a lawsuit in response to the borough's action. After six years of litigation in the federal courts, Tenafly settled by keeping the eruvs intact and paid $325,000 of the plaintiff's legal fees.

The following table shows the mayoral history of Tenafly since World War II.

Mayoral history of Tenafly
Mayor	Party	Term start	Term end
Emerson Church	Democratic; switched to Republican	1946	1947
E. Merrill Seaberg	Republican	1948	1951
Stanley Cattelle	Republican	1952	1953
Clifton Fleet	Republican	1954	1957
Howard W. Booth	Republican	1958	1961
Willard B. Knowlton	Republican	1962	1963
Robert E. Shull	Republican	1964	1967
Robert V. Bollerman	Republican	1968	1969
Walter Hartung	Republican	1970	1975
John Manos	Republican	1976	1979
Richard Van Nostrand	Republican	1979	1991
Walter Hemberger	Republican	1991	1995
Ann Moscovitz	Democratic	1996	2003
Peter Rustin	Independent	2004	2018
Mark Zinna	Democratic	2019	

=== Federal, state and county representation ===
Tenafly is located in the 5th Congressional District and is part of New Jersey's 37th state legislative district.

Prior to the 2010 Census, Tenafly had been part of the 5th Congressional District, a change made by the New Jersey Redistricting Commission that took effect in January 2013, based on the results of the November 2012 general elections. In redistricting following the 2010 census, the borough was in the 9th congressional district, which was in effect from 2013 to 2022.

For the 119th United States Congress, New Jersey's 5th congressional district is represented by Josh Gottheimer (D, Wyckoff). New Jersey is represented in the United States Senate by Democrats Cory Booker (Newark, term ends 2027) and Andy Kim (Moorestown, term ends 2031).

For the 2026–2027 session, the 37th legislative district of the New Jersey Legislature is represented in the New Jersey Senate by Gordon M. Johnson (D, Englewood) and in the General Assembly by Shama Haider (D, Tenafly) and Ellen Park (D, Englewood Cliffs).

Bergen County is governed by a directly elected County Executive, with legislative functions performed by a Board of County Commissioners comprised of seven members who are elected at-large to three-year terms in partisan elections on a staggered basis, with either two or three seats coming up for election each November; a Chairman and Vice Chairman are selected from among its seven members at a reorganization meeting held every January. As of 2025, the county executive is James J. Tedesco III (D, Paramus), whose four-year term of office ends December 31, 2026.

Bergen County's Commissioners are Chair Mary J. Amoroso (D, Mahwah, 2025), Vice Chair Steven A. Tanelli (D, North Arlington, 2027), Chair Pro Tem Joan Voss (D, Fort Lee, 2026), Rafael Marte (D, Bergenfield, 2026), Germaine M. Ortiz (D, Emerson, 2025), Thomas J. Sullivan Jr. (D, Montvale, 2025) and Tracy Silna Zur (D, Franklin Lakes, 2027).

Bergen County's elected constitutional officials are Clerk John S. Hogan (D, Northvale, 2026), Sheriff Anthony Cureton (D, Englewood, 2027) and Surrogate Michael R. Dressler (D, Cresskill, 2026).

=== Politics ===
As of March 2011, there were a total of 8,709 registered voters in Tenafly, of whom 3,082 (35.4% vs. 31.7% countywide) were registered as Democrats, 1,445 (16.6% vs. 21.1%) were registered as Republicans and 4,181 (48.0% vs. 47.1%) were registered as Unaffiliated. There was one voter registered to another party. Among the borough's 2010 Census population, 60.1% (vs. 57.1% in Bergen County) were registered to vote, including 87.3% of those aged 18 and over (vs. 73.7% countywide).

Gubernatorial election results for Tenafly
Year	Republican		Democratic		Third party(ies)	
Year	No.	%	No.	%	No.	%
2025	2,005	37.93%	3,260	61.67%	21	0.40%
2021	1,352	33.53%	2,657	65.90%	23	0.57%
2017	950	30.41%	2,130	68.18%	44	1.41%
2013	2,046	57.33%	1,505	42.17%	18	0.50%
2009	1,701	39.00%	2,454	56.27%	206	4.72%
2005	1,591	35.83%	2,782	62.64%	68	1.53%

In the 2012 presidential election, Democrat Barack Obama received 3,694 votes (58.8% vs. 54.8% countywide), ahead of Republican Mitt Romney with 2,489 votes (39.6% vs. 43.5%) and other candidates with 62 votes (1.0% vs. 0.9%), among the 6,281 ballots cast by the borough's 9,322 registered voters, for a turnout of 67.4% (vs. 70.4% in Bergen County). In the 2008 presidential election, Democrat Barack Obama received 4,285 votes (63.3% vs. 53.9% countywide), ahead of Republican John McCain with 2,376 votes (35.1% vs. 44.5%) and other candidates with 54 votes (0.8% vs. 0.8%), among the 6,773 ballots cast by the borough's 9,002 registered voters, for a turnout of 75.2% (vs. 76.8% in Bergen County). In the 2004 presidential election, Democrat John Kerry received 4,195 votes (61.3% vs. 51.7% countywide), ahead of Republican George W. Bush with 2,569 votes (37.5% vs. 47.2%) and other candidates with 53 votes (0.8% vs. 0.7%), among the 6,848 ballots cast by the borough's 8,871 registered voters, for a turnout of 77.2% (vs. 76.9% in the whole county).

United States presidential election results for Tenafly 2024 2020 2016 2012 2008 2004
Year	Republican		Democratic		Third party(ies)	
Year	No.	%	No.	%	No.	%
2024	2,549	35.73%	4,506	63.16%	79	1.11%
2020	2,226	28.04%	5,635	70.97%	79	0.99%
2016	1,931	28.89%	4,542	67.95%	211	3.16%
2012	2,489	39.86%	3,694	59.15%	62	0.99%
2008	2,376	35.38%	4,285	63.81%	54	0.80%
2004	2,569	37.69%	4,195	61.54%	53	0.78%

In the 2013 gubernatorial election, Republican Chris Christie received 57.3% of the vote (2,046 cast), ahead of Democrat Barbara Buono with 42.2% (1,505 votes) and other candidates with 0.5% (18 votes), among the 3,667 ballots cast by the borough's 8,800 registered voters (98 ballots were spoiled), for a turnout of 41.7%. In the 2009 gubernatorial election, Democrat Jon Corzine received 2,454 ballots cast (55.8% vs. 48.0% countywide), ahead of Republican Chris Christie with 1,701 votes (38.7% vs. 45.8%), Independent Chris Daggett with 189 votes (4.3% vs. 4.7%) and other candidates with 17 votes (0.4% vs. 0.5%), among the 4,401 ballots cast by the borough's 8,782 registered voters, yielding a 50.1% turnout (vs. 50.0% in the county).

United States Senate election results for Tenafly1
Year	Republican		Democratic		Third party(ies)	
Year	No.	%	No.	%	No.	%
2024	2,233	32.61%	4,496	65.65%	119	1.74%
2018	1,590	33.77%	3,008	63.88%	111	2.36%
2012	2,107	36.20%	3,628	62.34%	85	1.46%
2006	1,471	34.88%	2,700	64.03%	46	1.09%

United States Senate election results for Tenafly2
Year	Republican		Democratic		Third party(ies)	
Year	No.	%	No.	%	No.	%
2020	2,363	30.24%	5,330	68.21%	121	1.55%
2014	1,415	33.44%	2,771	65.49%	45	1.06%
2013	781	31.40%	1,692	68.03%	14	0.56%
2008	2,166	34.87%	3,982	64.11%	63	1.01%

== Education ==
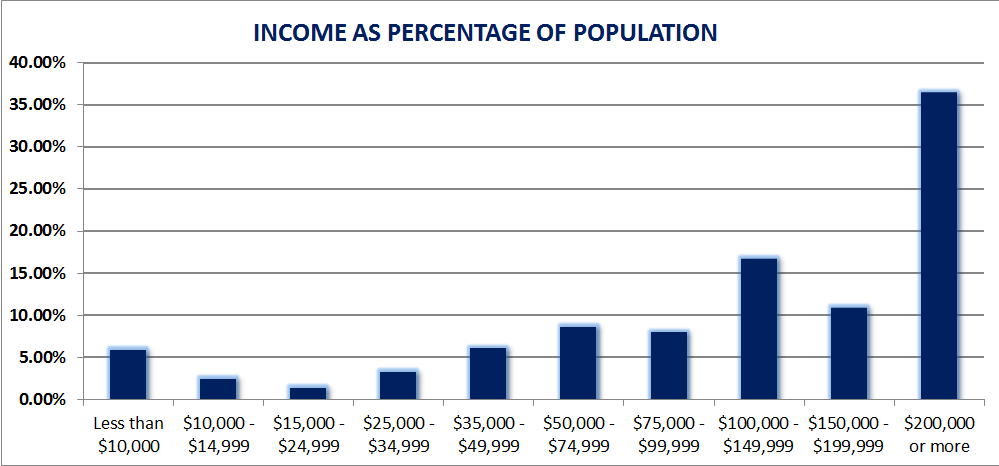
Tenafly Income Distribution 2010–2014 American Community Survey 5-Year Estimates

The Tenafly Public Schools serve students from pre-kindergarten through twelfth grade. As of the 2024–25 school year, the district, comprised of six schools, had an enrollment of 3,465 students and 291.7 classroom teachers (on an FTE basis), for a student–teacher ratio of 11.9:1. Schools in the district (with 2024–25 enrollment data from the National Center for Education Statistics) are Malcolm S. Mackay Elementary School with 349 students in grades K–5 Ralph S. Maugham Elementary School with 358 students in grades K–5 J. Spencer Smith Elementary School with 326 students in grades K–5 Walter Stillman Elementary School with 315 students in grades PreK–5 Tenafly Middle School with 916 students in grades 6–8 and Tenafly High School with 1,141 students in grades 9–12. Students from Alpine attend Tenafly High School as part of a sending/receiving relationship.

The United States Department of Education awarded Tenafly High School the National Blue Ribbon School Award of Excellence at a special assembly to the Tenafly High School community on September 20, 2005. Tenafly was the only high school in New Jersey and one of 38 public high schools in the U.S. to receive the 2005 Blue Ribbon School Award.

The school was the third-ranked public high school in New Jersey out of 328 schools statewide in New Jersey Monthly magazine's September 2012 cover story on the state's "Top Public High Schools", after also being ranked third in 2010 out of 322 schools listed. Schooldigger.com ranked the school as tied for 26th out of 376 public high schools statewide in its 2010 rankings (unchanged from the 2009 rank) which were based on the combined percentage of students classified as proficient or above proficient on the language arts literacy and mathematics components of the High School Proficiency Assessment (HSPA).

Tenafly High School had the 16th highest SAT scores in the state among students in the class of 2017.

Public school students from the borough, and all of Bergen County, are eligible to attend the secondary education programs offered by the Bergen County Technical Schools, which include the Bergen County Academies in Hackensack, and the Bergen Tech campus in Teterboro or Paramus. The district offers programs on a shared-time or full-time basis, with admission based on a selective application process and tuition covered by the student's home school district.

Academy of Our Lady of Mount Carmel, which operates under the supervision of the Roman Catholic Archdiocese of Newark, was recognized in 2012 by the National Blue Ribbon Schools Program of the United States Department of Education, one of 15 public and private schools in the state to be honored that year.

== Transportation ==
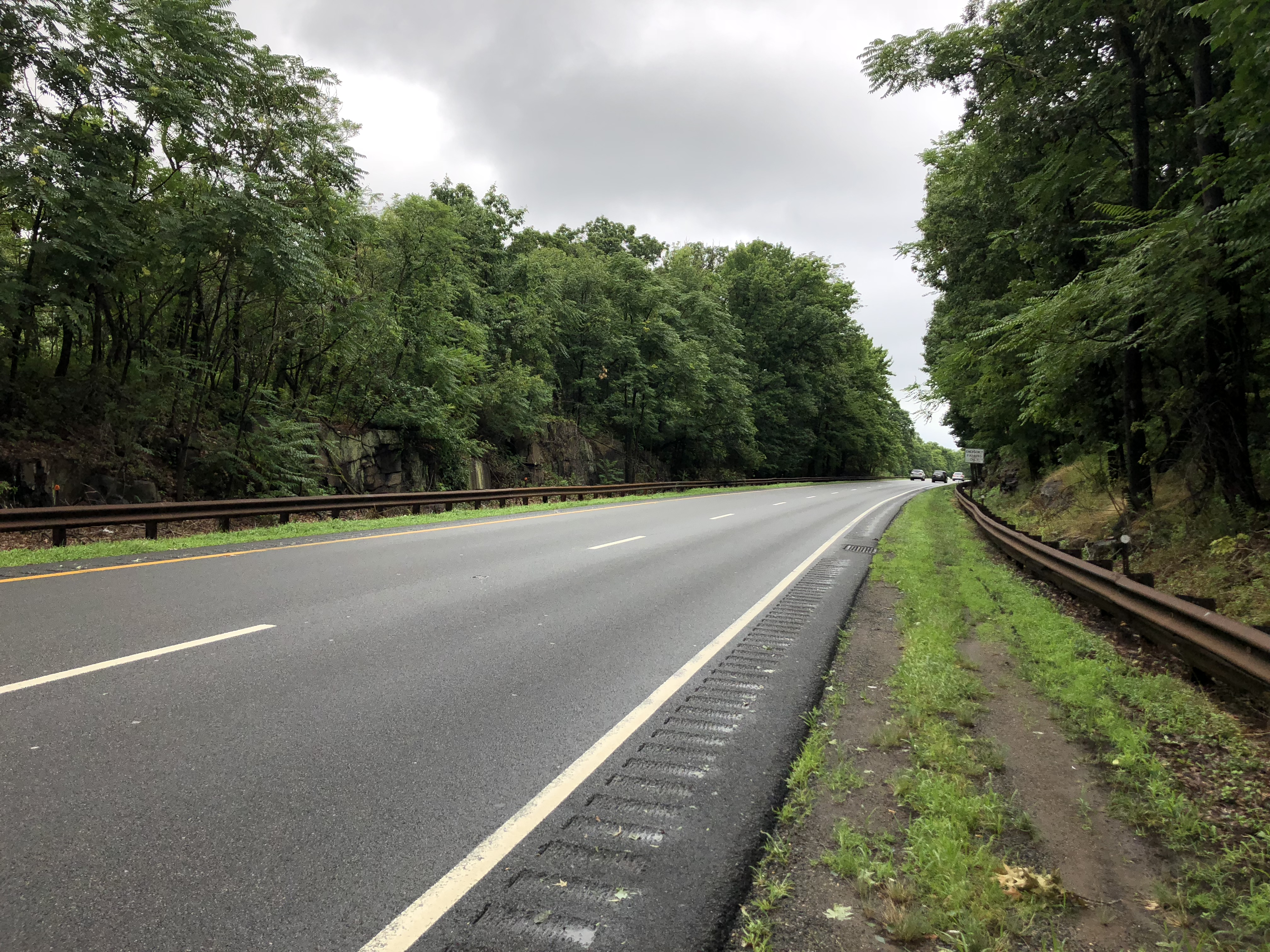
View north along the Palisades Interstate Parkway in Tenafly

As of May 2010, the borough had a total of 64.55 miles (103.88 km) of roadways, of which 54.71 miles (88.05 km) were maintained by the municipality, 6.85 miles (11.02 km) by Bergen County, 1.5 miles (2.4 km) by the New Jersey Department of Transportation and 1.49 miles (2.40 km) by the Palisades Interstate Park Commission.

CR 501, U.S. Route 9W and the Palisades Interstate Parkway all pass through Tenafly.

The Palisades Interstate Parkway runs above the Hudson River from Englewood Cliffs north towards Alpine. There are no exits on the parkway in Tenafly; the nearest interchanges are Exit 1 in Englewood Cliffs to the south and Exit 2 in Alpine in the north.

U.S. Route 9W adjoins and runs parallel to the Palisades Interstate Parkway.

=== Public transportation ===
Local and express bus service to and from New York City is available via NJ Transit bus route 166 to and from the Port Authority Bus Terminal in New York City.

Rockland Coaches provides services to the Port Authority Bus Terminal on Routes 9/9A/9T/9TA from Stony Point, New York, and the 20/20T routes from West Nyack, New York.

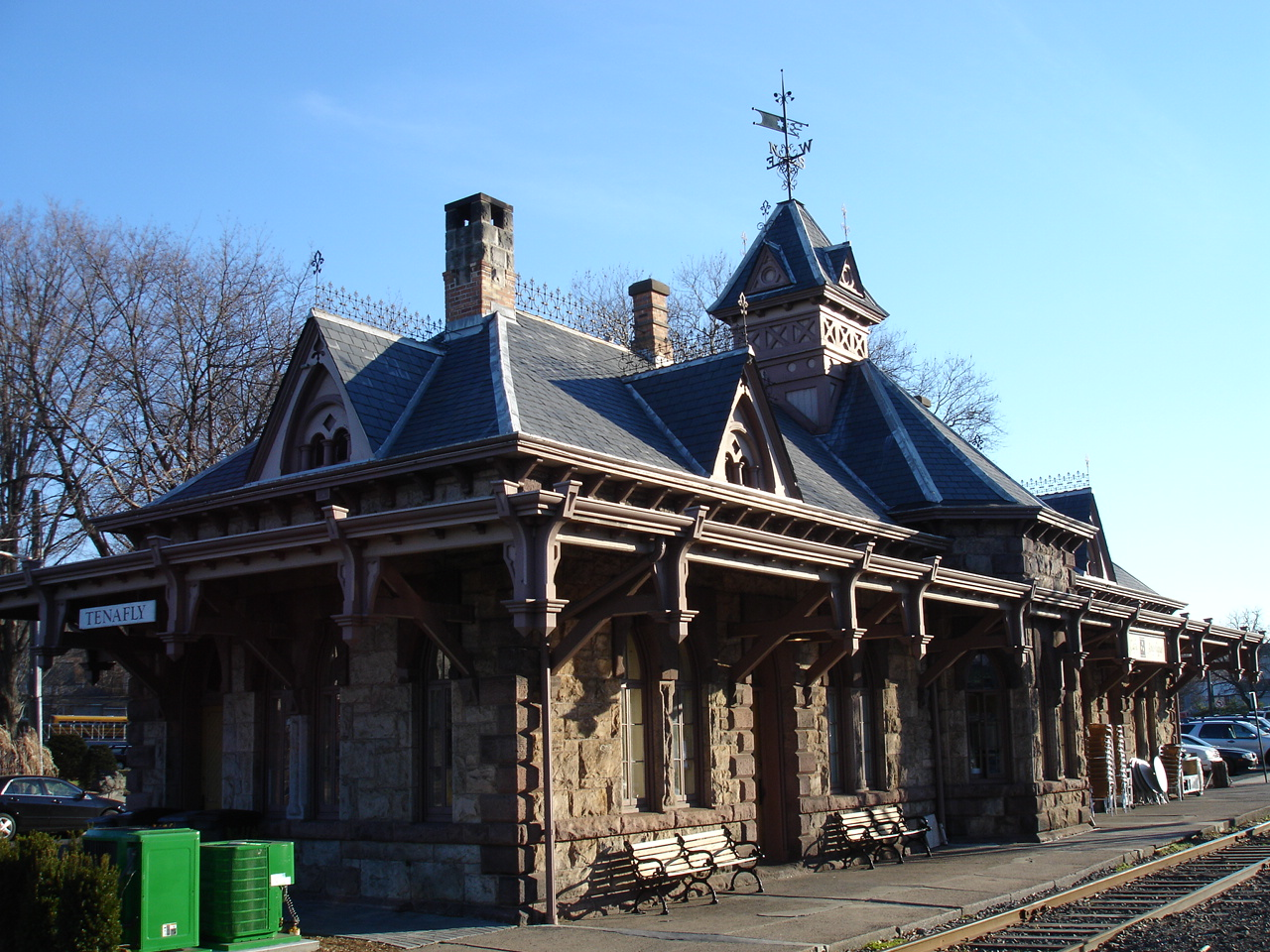
The former Tenafly Station, currently a restaurant

From the mid-1850s until September 1966, Tenafly was served by rail along the Northern Branch, originally to Pavonia Terminal and later to Hoboken Terminal. CSX now provides freight service along the line. The former Tenafly Station, currently a restaurant, was added to the National Register of Historic Places in 1979; it is one of four surviving stations on the Northern Branch.

The Northern Branch Corridor Project, a proposal by New Jersey Transit to extend the Hudson Bergen Light Rail for nine stops and 11 miles (18 km) northward from its current terminus in North Bergen to two stations in Tenafly, the last of which would be a new terminus near the Cresskill town line, met with mixed reactions. Many residents and officials believed that the negative consequences for the borough in terms of traffic and noise outweighed the benefits. In November 2010, voters rejected the plan to re-establish a rail service to the town by a nearly 2–1 ratio in a non-binding referendum, with all of the borough council candidates opposing the restoration of commuter train service. There is continued resistance to New Jersey Transit's preferred alternative as described in the plan's December 2011 announcement. Despite local opposition, officials in Bergen County asked the North Jersey Transportation Planning Authority to support the proposal. In 2013, New Jersey Transit announced that the line would end in Englewood, after Tenafly officials estimated that as much as $8 million in commercial property valuation would be lost and residents raised strong objections.

== Historic places ==
Historic locations in Tenafly include:

- Christie-Parsels House, 195 Jefferson Avenue.
- Cotswold Mansion, 1 Byrne Lane.
- Demarest-Lyle House, 91 West Clinton Avenue.
- Elizabeth Cady Stanton House, 135 Highwood Avenue, home of the women's rights activist from 1868 to 1887. Stanton unsuccessfully attempted to vote in the borough in 1880.
- Roelof Westervelt House, 81 Westervelt Avenue.
- Sickles-Melbourne House, 48 Knoll Road.
- Tenafly Railroad Station, 1 Piermont Road, a former railroad station that operated from the mid-1800s until 1966.
- Theodore Roosevelt Monument, Roosevelt Common, Riveredge Road.

== Notable people ==
People who were born in, residents of, or otherwise associated with Tenafly include:

- Edie Adams (1927–2008), entertainer
- Emin Agalarov (born 1979), Azerbaijani-Russian singer and businessman, who writes and performs songs in English and Russian and has been popular in both Azerbaijan and Russia
- Edan Alexander (born 2003), Israeli-American former hostage taken captive on October 7th, 2023
- Dean Amadon (1912–2003), ornithologist and an authority on birds of prey
- Dave Anderson (1929–2018), sportswriter for The New York Times who won the 1981 Pulitzer Prize for distinguished commentary on sporting events
- Hiroaki Aoki (1938–2008), founder of Benihana Japanese restaurant chain and father of DJ Steve Aoki lived in Tenafly during his Powerboating years
- Mark Attanasio (born 1957), investment banker and owner of the Milwaukee Brewers
- Cardi B (born 1992), Grammy-winning American rapper
- Peter Balakian (born 1951), Pulitzer Prize-winning poet and author
- Jesse Barfield (born 1959), Toronto Blue Jays and New York Yankees outfielder, lived in Tenafly during part of his career as a Yankee
- Mike Becker (born 1943), contract bridge player and official
- Gregg Berhalter (born 1973), head coach of the United States men's national soccer team
- Yogi Berra (1925–2015), player and manager for the New York Yankees
- Edna Libby Beutenmüller (1872–1934), scientific illustrator notable for her work in publications including those published by the American Museum of Natural History
- William Beutenmuller (1864–1934), entomologist who was curator of entomology at the American Museum of Natural History
- Matt Brown, collegiate ice hockey left winger at Boston University
- Verona Burkhard (1910–2004), artist, known for her murals painted for the U.S. Treasury Department
- Albert Burstein (1922–2018), former member of the New Jersey General Assembly who served as Majority Leader of the Assembly before being appointed to serve on the New Jersey Election Law Enforcement Commission
- Jonathan Carney, appointed concertmaster of the Baltimore Symphony Orchestra in 2002
- Orestes Cleveland (1829–1896), Mayor of Jersey City 1864–1867; 1886–1892, member of the U.S. House of Representatives from New Jersey's 5th congressional district from 1869 to 1871
- John S. Conway (1852–1925), artist and sculptor
- Herbert Dardik (1935–2020), vascular surgeon who served as the chief of vascular surgery at Englewood Hospital and Medical Center
- Hope Davis (born 1964), actress
- Jimmy Dean (1928–2010), singer turned breakfast meat entrepreneur
- Clifford Demarest (1874–1946), organist and composer
- Tate Donovan (born 1963), actor
- Alex Dezen (born 1978), platinum-selling songwriter and producer
- Eric J Dubowsky (born 1975), Emmy and Grammy award winning music producer
- Jeannine Edwards (born 1964), former ESPN/ABC sportscaster focusing on college football, college basketball and horse racing
- Victor Farris (1910–1985), inventor and businessman who has been credited with invention of the paper milk carton
- Fat Joe (stage name of Joseph Antonio Cartagena, born 1970), rapper
- Siggy Flicker (born 1967), cast member on the seventh season of Bravo's reality television series The Real Housewives of New Jersey
- Danny Forster (born 1977), television host, film/television producer and director, best known as the host of the Science Channel series Build It Bigger
- Bill Foxen (1879–1937), pitcher who played in Major League Baseball from 1908 to 1911 for the Chicago Cubs and Philadelphia Phillies
- Reuven Frank (1920–2006), former NBC News president and pioneer of Vietnam War-era news coverage
- Ralph Fuller (1890–1963), cartoonist best known for his long running comic strip Oaky Doaks
- Eran Ganot (born c. 1980), head coach of the Hawaii Rainbow Warriors basketball team
- Richard A. Gardner (1931–2003), child psychiatrist who coined the term "Parental Alienation Syndrome"
- Alan Geisler (c. 1931–2009), food chemist best known for creating the red onion sauce most often used as a condiment topping on hot dogs sold by street vendors in New York City
- Alexander Gemignani (born 1979), Broadway performer
- Alexie Gilmore (born 1976), actress who starred in the short-lived television series New Amsterdam
- Leon Goldensohn (1911–1961), psychiatrist who monitored the mental health of the 21 Nazi defendants awaiting trial at Nuremberg in 1946
- Lesley Gore (1946–2015), singer
- Nakia Griffin-Stewart (born 1996), American football tight end for the Kansas City Chiefs of the NFL
- Rusty Hamer (1947–1990), actor
- Big Bank Hank (born Henry Lee Jackson, 1957–2014), old school rapper and manager who was a member of The Sugarhill Gang, the first hip hop act to have a hit with the 1979 cross-over single "Rapper's Delight"
- Ed Harris (born 1950), actor. Grew up in the borough and attended Tenafly High School
- Seth Herzog (born 1970), comedian
- Jon-Erik Hexum (1957–1984), actor
- Jack Hobens (1880–1944), Scottish-American professional golfer who made the first ever U.S. Open hole-in-one at the 147-yard 10th hole in the second round of the 1907 U.S. Open
- Jay Huguley (born 1966), TV, film and theater actor, best known for starring as Whit Peyton in Brothers & Sisters
- John Huyler (1808–1870), represented New Jersey's 4th congressional district in the United States House of Representatives from 1857 to 1859
- Bill Hwang, manager in a financial company
- Ron Insana (born 1961), CNBC anchor and senior analyst
- Margaret Josephs (born 1967), fashion designer, entrepreneur and television lifestyle expert who is the owner, founder and designer of a lifestyle brand called the Macbeth Collection
- Irv Koons (1922–2017), graphic artist, industrial designer, and illustrator who was one of the leading consumer package designers of the 20th century
- Shlomit Levi (born 1983), Yemeni-Israeli singer who is a former touring member of the folk metal group Orphaned Land
- Ross Levinsohn (born c. 1964), interim CEO of Yahoo!
- Sarah Lewitinn (born 1980), alias Ultragrrrl, author, Spin assistant editor, blogger, downtown socialite
- Charles S. Lieber (1931–2009), clinical nutritionist who established that excess alcohol consumption can cause cirrhosis of the liver, even in subjects with an adequate diet
- Ignatius Lissner (1867–1948), French-born Catholic priest who was instrumental in developing the ministry of the Catholic Church in the United States to the African American population through the Society of African Missions
- Baby M (born 1986), subject of noted custody case between the egg donor/surrogate mother and the child's biological father
- Tino Martinez (born 1967), first baseman who played for the New York Yankees
- Don Mattingly (born 1961), New York Yankees
- Gil McDougald (1928–2010), American League Rookie of the Year winner in 1951, who played his entire career with the New York Yankees, appearing in 53 World Series games
- Richard P. McCormick (1916–2006), historian and professor, who was president of the New Jersey Historical Society
- Lea Michele (born 1986), actress best known for starring in the Fox TV show Glee as Rachel Berry
- Edward Miguel (born 1974), Professor of Environmental and Resource Economics at the University of California, Berkeley
- Glenn Miller (1904–1944), bandleader
- Ray Morgan (1913–1975), radio and television announcer
- David Nelson (1936–2011), actor, director and producer
- Don Nelson (1927–2013), screenwriter, film producer and jazz musician, best known for his work on the sitcom The Adventures of Ozzie and Harriet
- Ricky Nelson (1940–1985), actor, musician and singer-songwriter, who from the age of eight, starred alongside his family in the radio and television series The Adventures of Ozzie and Harriet
- Josette Norris (born 1995), middle to long distance runner
- Frank C. Osmers Jr. (1907–1977), represented New Jersey's 9th congressional district from 1939 to 1943 and from 1951 to 1965
- Florence Y. Pan (born 1966), lawyer who serves as a United States circuit judge of the United States Court of Appeals for the District of Columbia Circuit
- Barbara Pariente (born 1948), former chief justice of the Florida Supreme Court
- Carol Potter (born 1948), stage and television actress best known as Cindy Walsh on Beverly Hills, 90210
- George Price (1901–1995), cartoonist best known for his work for The New Yorker
- Tom Rinaldi, reporter for ESPN and ABC
- Seth Roland (born 1957), former soccer player who has been coach of the Fairleigh Dickinson Knights men's soccer team since 1997
- Adam Rothenberg (born 1975), stage and movie actor, Mad Money
- Steve Rothman, (born 1952), Congressman
- Peter Secchia (1937–2020), businessman who served as the United States Ambassador to Italy and San Marino from 1989 to 1993
- Gareb Shamus (born 1968), connectivist artist who works primarily as a painter
- David Shepard (1940–2017), film preservationist whose company, Film Preservation Associates, is responsible for many high-quality video versions of silent films
- Brandon Silverstein (born 1991), entrepreneur and entertainment industry executive
- Michael Sorvino (born 1977), actor and voice actor
- Mira Sorvino (born 1967), actress who won the Academy Award for Best Supporting Actress for her performance in Woody Allen's Mighty Aphrodite
- Paul Sorvino (1939-2022), actor
- Elizabeth Cady Stanton (1815–1902), leading figure in the early women's rights movement
- William Lee Stoddart (1868–1940), architect noted for hotels of the pre-World War II era along the East Coast of the United States
- Lori Stokes (born 1962), morning anchorwoman for WABC-TV
- George Tanham (1922–2003), international security expert who was an executive with the RAND Corporation
- Henry Taub (1927–2011), businessman and philanthropist who co-founded ADP
- Joe Taub (1929–2017), businessman who joined his brother Henry Taub and Frank Lautenberg in building the payroll company Automatic Data Processing and later was part of an investment group that acquired the New Jersey Nets
- Thomas D. Thacher (1881–1950), one-time Solicitor General of the United States
- Caren Turner (born 1957), infamous for her role in the "Tenafly Traffic Stop Incident" which forced her to resign from her career
- Trish Van Devere (born 1941), actress
- Huyler Westervelt (1869–1949), pitcher who had a 7–10 record in his single MLB season with the New York Giants
- Jacob Aaron Westervelt (1800–1879), shipbuilder in the mid-19th century and Mayor of New York City (1853–1855)
- Tracy Wolfson (born 1975), sportscaster for CBS Sports
- Sofie Zamchick (born 1994), folk-pop singer-songwriter and actress, best known as the voice of Linny the Guinea Pig on the animated children's television series, Wonder Pets
- Milan Zeleny (1942–2023), economist
