= Irv Koons =

American graphic artist, industrial designer, and illustrator

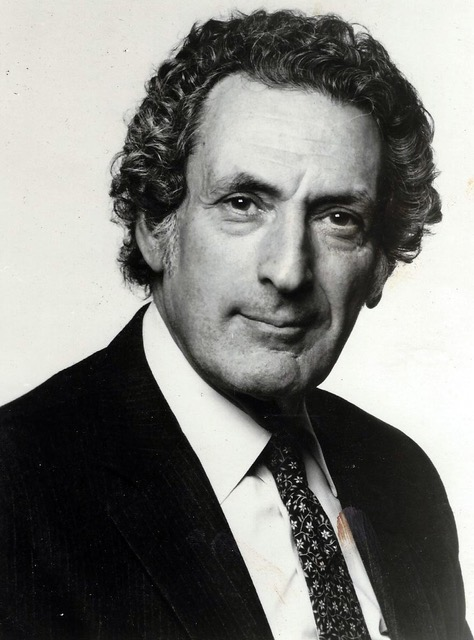
- Koons, circa 1982
- Born: Irvin Louis Koons; March 14, 1922; Harrisburg, Pennsylvania, U.S.
- Died: September 10, 2017 (aged 95); Englewood, New Jersey, U.S.
- Occupations: Artist, industrial designer, illustrator
- Spouse: Leah Fay Koons (m. 1949)

Irvin Louis Koons (March 14, 1922 – September 10, 2017) was an American graphic artist, industrial designer, and illustrator who became one of the leading consumer package designers of the 20th century. In 1949, he founded Irv Koons Associates, Inc., an industrial design firm particularly noted for the package design of consumer goods.

== Early life ==
Irvin Louis Koons was born March 14, 1922, in Harrisburg, Pennsylvania, the son of Frank and Rose (Silver) Koons. His father owned a printing shop and, as a teenager, Koons began assisting in the family business by designing items for their clients (throughout his career, he credited his father as the major influence on his design aesthetic). In 1932, his older sister, Eleanor Pearl Koons, drowned in a local swimming pool at age 14. Shortly thereafter, the family moved to Reading, Pennsylvania.

In 1939, after graduating from Reading High School early at the age of 16, Koons went to New York City, where he studied art at the Pratt Institute. With only $100 in his pocket when he arrived in New York, Koons worked his way through school by teaching art in settlement houses, selling his class projects, and washing dishes. In 1942, after taking a course in camouflage design, he was drafted into the U.S. Army and trained in the infantry and the amphibious engineers.

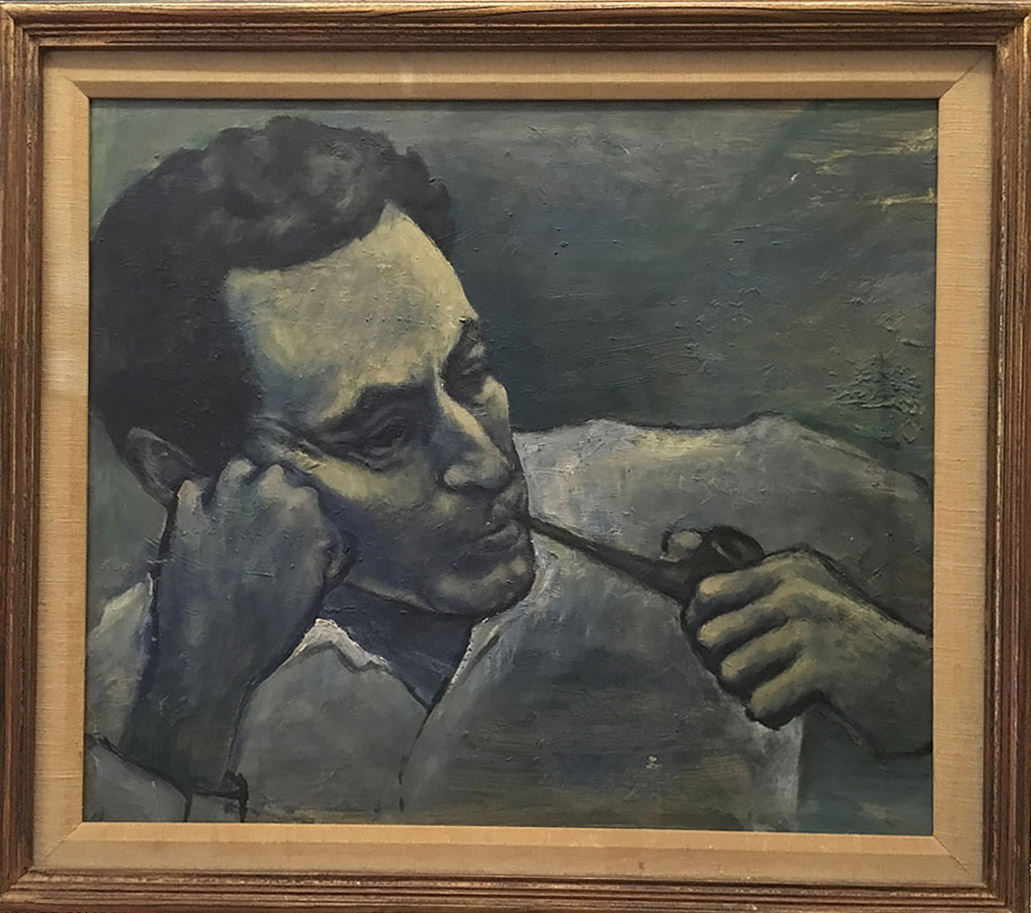
Portrait of Irv Koons by Leah Fay Koons

Just before his unit was deployed for combat, he was reassigned to a Special Services unit in Fort Meade, Maryland, where he designed stage sets for Broadway shows traveling to overseas army posts to entertain the troops. He was then assigned to New York to work as a designer/illustrator for the Army's Information and Education Division before being sent to New Delhi, India to work as art director for the China Burma India Theater. Despite still only being in his early twenties, Koons was assigned the position of acting cultural attaché for the United States Information Agency in India and the U.S. State Department. He also served as art critic for The Statesman, India's leading English-language newspaper at the time, was guest editor of Roopa-Lekha, the Indian art magazine, and became a member of the All India Fine Arts and Crafts Society. Koons helped organize the first International Art Exhibition held in India and was instrumental in the founding of the National Art Gallery of India.

After the war, Koons studied painting at the École des Beaux-Arts at Fontainebleau. In 1950, shortly after their marriage, he and his wife Leah, who was also a painter, were invited back to Fontainebleau to teach art and continue their painting. Although he realized early on that his career was in commercial art and design, Koons was an accomplished and prolific painter and sculptor, and he continued to work in a variety of mediums, but chiefly in oil painting, for the rest of his life.

== Career ==
=== Illustration ===
In 1946, after his discharge from the army, Irv Koons returned to New York where he enrolled in The New School and received his first major assignment, a series of forty illustrations for Simon & Schuster for a humorous "travel diary" by American novelist David Dodge. The assignment had been held for him until his arrival in New York by an editor who had seen some of the drawings he had sent from India to friends in lieu of letters. The book, titled How Green Was My Father, chronicles the Dodge family's misadventures as they travel from San Francisco to Guatemala, via the Pan American Highway through Mexico, by car. Koons was given no instructions about what to illustrate, and he had not met Dodge or his family at this point. His drawings for the book were purely from his imagination and his interpretation of Dodge's writing. After the book was published, reviewers remarked that Koons must know Mexico well. However, he had never been there; he illustrated aspects of Mexico that he guessed would be similar to India and adapted them based on Dodge's descriptions. Koons went on to illustrate four more of Dodge's books, How Lost Was My Weekend (1948), The Crazy Glasspecker (1949), 20,000 Leagues Behind the 8 Ball (1951), and The Poor Man's Guide to Europe (1953), and provided dust jacket art for Time Out For Turkey (1955).

Koons also contributed illustrations to a variety of periodicals, such as Fortune, Family Circle, Seventeen, Ladies' Home Journal, Good Housekeeping, and Sports Illustrated. In his eighties, Koons illustrated two children's books written by his son Jon Koons.

=== Type design ===
In 1956, along with his associate Ben Rosen, Koons designed the first cold type offset newspaper in the world, The Middletown Daily Record in Middletown, New York. He also designed special equipment and furniture for the venture and taught a group of locals with virtually no art training how to do print mechanicals and produce the newspaper daily.

=== Package design / Irv Koons Associates, Inc. ===
Although he continued to illustrate David Dodge's books until the mid-1950s, Irv Koons' professional focus shifted from illustration to packaging and industrial design. In 1949, he founded his own consulting design firm, Irv Koons Associates, Inc. (IKA), in New York, for which he served as CEO and Creative Head. IKA was the leading packaging design firm for four decades, with more than two dozen employees at its height. In 1981, the firm was acquired by Saatchi & Saatchi, the world's largest advertising agency at the time. In November 1988, Koons resigned from the Saatchi organization to join the United Nations Development Programme as Senior Advisor to the Administrator, a volunteer appointment.

Before settling into package and product design, Koons provided numerous illustrations for advertisements, then quickly transitioned into creating entire advertising campaigns. IKA's first packaging design client was Consolidated Cigar Corporation in 1953, for whom he provided designs for Yorkshire Cigars, a private label brand for Sears. In 1956, Koons accepted an assignment for Joseph E. Seagram & Sons, Inc., manufacturer of Seven Crown whiskey. Shortly thereafter, C.F. Mueller Company, a New Jersey pasta manufacturer, joined the client list. All three of these relationships lasted for decades during which time IKA created packages for multiple brands.

In addition to Consolidated Cigar, Seagram, and Mueller, Koons worked on projects for many other companies and organizations designing packaging, advertisements and logos, leaflets, brochures, and booklets. Among his best-known clients were Revlon, Bristol Myers / Clairol, Gillette, Nabisco, Milton Bradley Company, General Foods, Johnson & Johnson, Procter & Gamble, Scott Paper Company, American Can Company, and American Home Products, among many others. He worked on the design or redesign of many of the most recognizable products in America, including Crest toothpaste, Dixie Cups, Band-Aid adhesive bandages, Scotties facial tissues, Maxwell House coffee, Chun King foods, Alpo pet food, and many more. His design for Good & Plenty licorice candy, his iconic bottle design for Frïs Vodka, and numerous other designs are still in use today.

=== Non-profit and Jewish organization work ===
Koons also designed items, including advertising and publications, for various non-profits and Jewish organizations such as American Cancer Society, The Legal Aid Society, Memorial Sloan Kettering Cancer Center, United Cerebral Palsy, the American Jewish Tercentenary, the American Jewish Heritage Commission, the Union of American Hebrew Congregations, and several synagogues and community centers. For over twenty years he served as the design and graphics consultant for both the Federation of Jewish Philanthropies of New York and the Jewish Theological Seminary of America. Koons also created Jewish art pieces, including a complete set of eight Torah ornaments for the Temple Emanu-El in Englewood (now Closter, New Jersey). Cast in solid silver with gold plated highlights and antiquing, which Koons did by hand himself, this was the first such coordinated set of ornaments ever executed. The designs were based on the burning bush, each depicting a different interpretation of the eight most important events in the history of the Jewish people; the crowns symbolized the flames. In 1960, he designed and executed a massive (50 feet wide x 9 feet tall) memorial wall comprising seven stained-glass windows depicting Biblical events for a conference hall at the Federation of Jewish Philanthropies of New York.

=== Awards and honors ===
Koons won numerous awards for marketing, packaging, and advertising. In 1982 he was named the Packaging Person of the Year by the Packaging Designers Council. This was a rare award, having been presented only three times before, and only when the Council thought it warranted. The award presentation and dinner was originally scheduled to take place at the Plaza Hotel in New York City in a room designed to hold about fifty attendees. However, the PDC received such an overwhelming response from designers, friends, and students from around the world who wanted to attend that the event had to be moved at the last minute to a larger venue at the St. Regis New York.

His products won Clio Awards several times, including three gold Clios, and his work is included in the collections of the Museum of Modern Art, the Cooper Hewitt, Smithsonian Design Museum, the Jewish Museum (Manhattan), the Hagley Museum and Library, Yeshiva University Museum, and The Bancroft Library. In 2001, Irv Koons was included in 2000 Outstanding Artists and Designers of the 20th Century, published by the International Biographical Centre in Cambridge, England.

=== Teaching and lecturing ===
Throughout his nearly fifty-year career, Koons worked tirelessly to promote a better understanding of the role of packaging in the successful marketing of commercial products and a greater appreciation for the historical importance of packaging. He lectured and taught extensively and, in 1973, developed a three-day "Fundamentals of Packaging" course for the New York University School of Continuing Education that included intensive professional seminars on packaging design and product marketing. He later expanded his seminar to reach international audiences in London, São Paulo, Amsterdam, Johannesburg, Israel, and elsewhere.

=== Irv Koons Design ===
After his retirement, Koons established Irv Koons Design, an independent design consulting firm, at his home in Tenafly, New Jersey. He also did freelance design work.

== Personal life ==
Irv Koons was married to Leah Fay on December 25, 1949, and they had three sons, Adam, Jonathan, and Joshua.

== Death ==
At the end of his life, Irv Koons moved into the Lillian Booth Actors Home in Englewood, New Jersey, where Leah was also a resident. He died there on September 10, 2017. Leah died on February 18, 2019. They are both buried in Calverton National Cemetery in Calverton, New York.

== Books illustrated by Irv Koons ==
- Burstein, Abraham. Judah Halevi in Granada: A Story of His Boyhood. Bloch Publishing Company, 1941.
- Dodge, David. How Green Was My Father. Simon & Schuster, 1946.
- Dodge, David. How Lost Was My Weekend. Random House, 1948.
- Dodge, David. The Crazy Glasspecker, or, High Life in the Andes. Random House, 1949.
- Dodge, David. 20,000 Leagues Behind the 8 Ball. Random House, 1951.
- Dodge, David. The Poor Man's Guide to Europe. Random House, 1953 (updated and revised annually 1954–1959).
- Dodge, David. Time Out for Turkey. Random House, 1955 (dust jacket design only).
- Koons, Jon. Any Fool Can Do Magic!: A Jester's Guide to Becoming a Great Magician. Ye Olde Cambridge Jester's Academy, 1995; Metamorphic Press, 2021. ISBN 978-1-951221-17-1
- Koons, Jon. Young Arthur & the Magic Sword: Stories for the Young at Heart. BearManor Media, 2015; Metamorphic Press, 2020. ISBN 978-1-951221-08-9
