= To Catch a Thief =

1955 film by Alfred Hitchcock

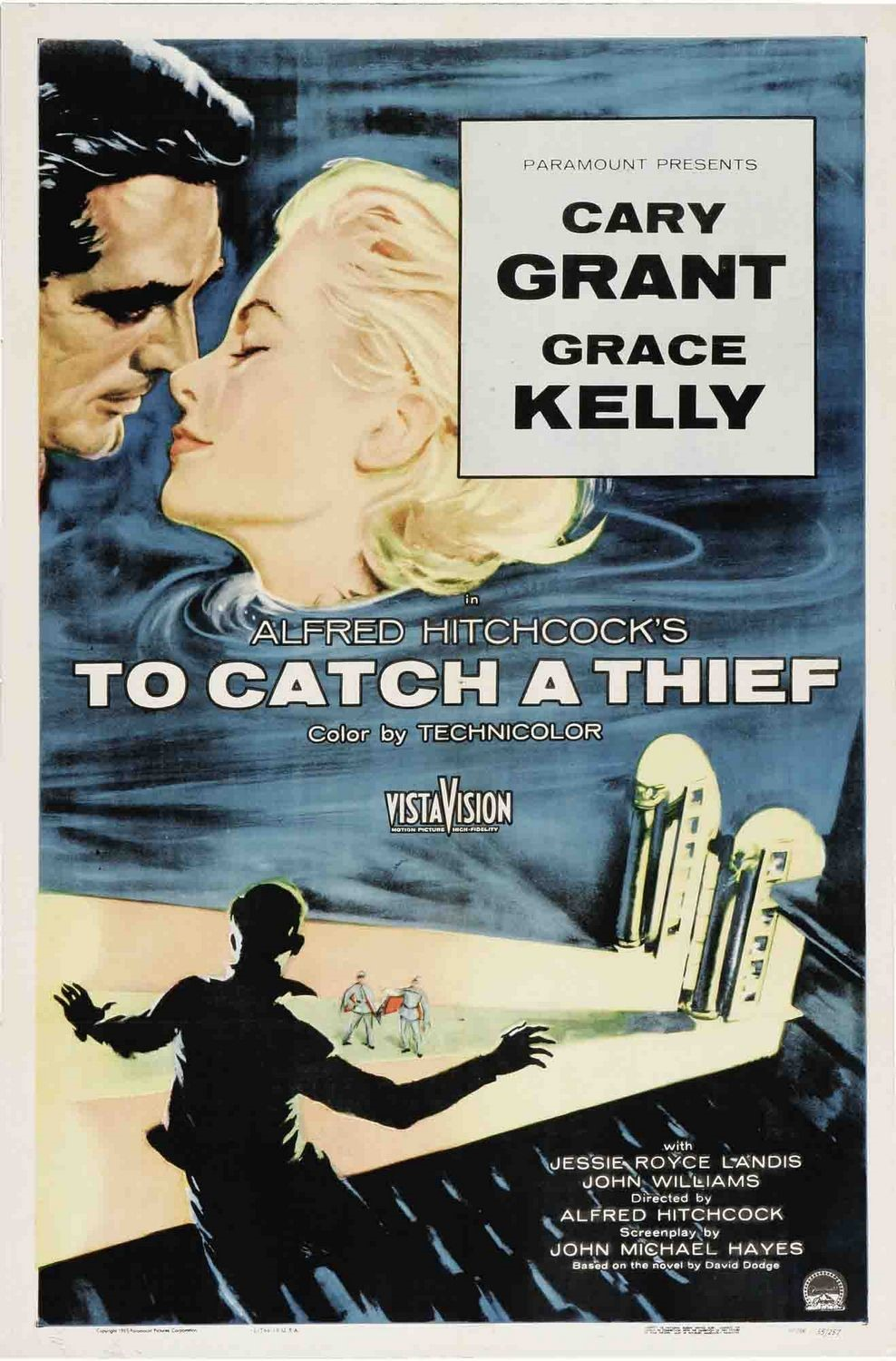
- Theatrical release poster
- Directed by: Alfred Hitchcock
- Screenplay by: John Michael Hayes
- Based on: To Catch a Thief by David Dodge
- Produced by: Alfred Hitchcock
- Starring: Cary Grant; Grace Kelly; Jessie Royce Landis; John Williams
- Cinematography: Robert Burks
- Edited by: George Tomasini
- Music by: Lyn Murray
- Distributed by: Paramount Pictures
- Release date: August 3, 1955 (Los Angeles)
- Running time: 107 minutes
- Country: United States
- Languages: English; French
- Budget: $2.5 million
- Box office: $4.5 million (U.S. rentals) $8.75 million

To Catch a Thief is a 1955 American romantic thriller film directed by Alfred Hitchcock, from a screenplay by John Michael Hayes based on the 1952 novel of the same name by David Dodge. The film stars Cary Grant as a retired cat burglar who has to save his reformed reputation by catching an impostor preying on wealthy tourists (including an oil-rich widow and her daughter played by Grace Kelly) on the French Riviera.

== Plot ==
Trailer for To Catch a Thief

Police suspect retired jewel thief John "The Cat" Robie may be responsible for a string of burglaries on the French Riviera. When they arrive at his hilltop villa to question him, Robie slips away and heads to a restaurant owned by his friend, Bertani. The restaurant's staff, members of Robie's old gang who were paroled for their work in the French Resistance, are angry at Robie because they are all under suspicion as long as the new Cat is active. When the police arrive at the restaurant looking for Robie, Danielle, the daughter of the restaurant's wine steward Foussard, spirits him to safety.

Robie wants to prove his innocence by catching the new Cat. He enlists help from insurance agent H.H. Hughson, who reluctantly provides a list of persons currently on the Riviera with the most expensive jewelry. American tourists Jessie Stevens, a wealthy nouveau riche widow, and her daughter Frances, top the list; Robie strikes up a friendship with them, posing as an Oregon businessman on vacation. Frances feigns modesty at first, but kisses Robie as she retires to her room.

The next day, Frances invites Robie for a swim at the Cannes beach where he runs into Danielle. He maintains his cover as a wealthy American tourist, despite Danielle's jealous barbs about his interest in Frances. Frances accompanies Robie to a villa he says he is interested in renting but actually suspects might be the new Cat's next target. Frances reveals that she knows Robie's real identity. He initially denies it but concedes as the two watch a fireworks display from her hotel room later that night. They kiss passionately.

The next morning, Jessie's jewels are gone. Frances accuses Robie and claims he used her as a distraction. She calls the police but Robie disappears by the time they arrive on the scene.

That night, an assailant attacks Robie as he stakes out an estate while trying to catch the thief. A second attacker tries to kill him but accidentally hits the first assailant, who falls off the estate's seawall into the water. Police recover the body, which turns out to be Foussard.

The police chief publicly announces that Foussard was the jewel thief. However, Robie points out to the police and Hughson that Foussard had a prosthetic leg and was unable to climb on rooftops. Foussard's funeral is interrupted by Danielle's loud accusation that Robie is responsible for her father's death. Outside the cemetery, Frances apologizes to Robie and confesses her love. Robie asks her to arrange his attendance at a masquerade ball she and Jessie are invited to and where he believes the Cat will strike.

Robie accompanies Frances to the ball dressed as a masked Moor. The police hover nearby hoping to catch the Cat. When Jessie addresses the Moor as "John" and asks him to fetch her "heartburn pills" from upstairs, the authorities are seemingly tipped off to his identity. Upon the masked Moor's return, the police wait as he and Frances dance together all night. When the masked Moor accompanies Frances to her room it is revealed to be Hughson, who switched places with Robie to conceal the latter's exit. Upstairs, the burglar silently cleans out several jewel boxes.

Robie hides atop the roof waiting for the Cat. He is about to leave when a figure in black finally emerges. Robie apprehends the person and unmasks Danielle. The police throw a spotlight on him and demand he surrender, giving Danielle a chance to slip away. Robie flees as they shoot at him. He corners his foe with jewels in hand. Danielle slips and goes over the roof's edge but catches the eave with one hand. Robie grabs her wrist, and as she hangs in his grasp, he forces her to admit to the police below that Bertani planned the thefts.

Later, Robie speeds back to his villa, followed by Frances. She tries to convince him that she has a place in his life. He agrees but looks less than thrilled when she says that her mother will love his villa.

== Cast ==
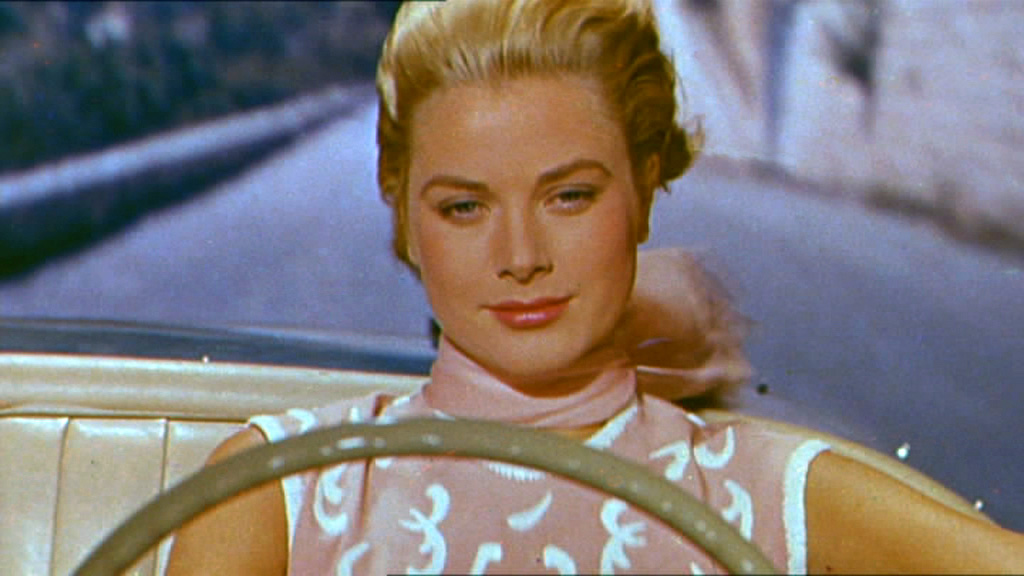
Kelly as Frances Stevens

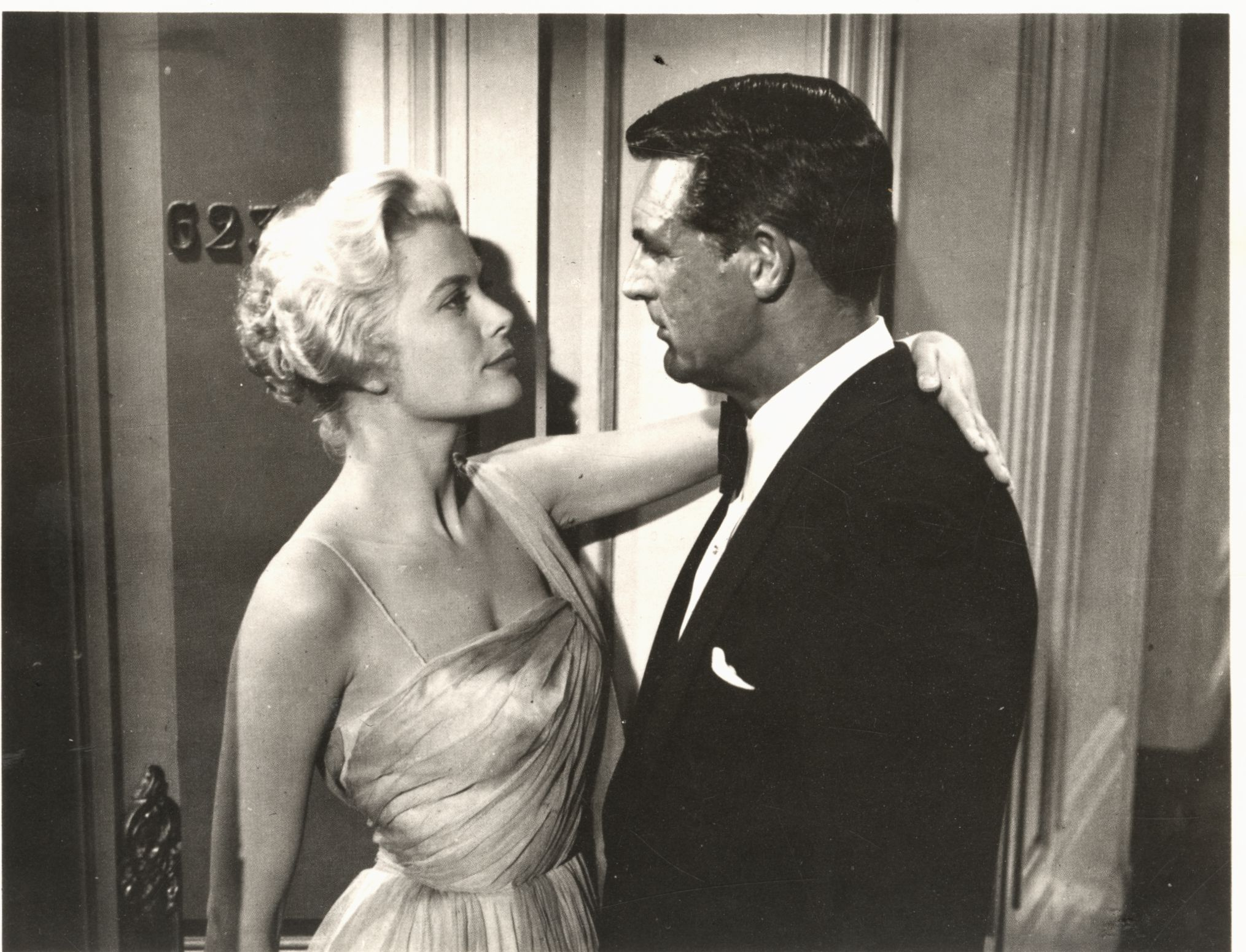
Grace Kelly and Cary Grant in a scene

- Cary Grant as John Robie (alias "The Cat"; alias "Conrad Burns")
- Grace Kelly as Frances Stevens
- Jessie Royce Landis as Jessie Stevens
- John Williams as H.H. Hughson
- Charles Vanel as Monsieur Bertani
- Brigitte Auber as Danielle Foussard
- Jean Martinelli as Foussard, Danielle's father
- Georgette Anys as Germaine, housekeeper
- René Blancard as Commissaire Lepic (uncredited)
- Paul Newlan as Vegetable Man in Kitchen (uncredited)

=== Cast notes ===
- Alfred Hitchcock makes his signature cameo, approximately ten minutes into the film, as a bus passenger sitting next to Cary Grant and a caged pair of birds.

== Production ==
To Catch a Thief was Hitchcock's first of five films made using the VistaVision widescreen process, and the last of three starring Grace Kelly. It was also Hitchcock's penultimate collaboration with Cary Grant, followed by North by Northwest (1959); both films are about a man with a mistaken identity who goes on an adventure to prove his innocence.

Grant received more than $700,000 from his 10% of the gross for the film, while Hitchcock received less than $50,000.

The costumes were by Edith Head, including Kelly's gold lamé gown for the film's costume ball.

The car driven by Grace Kelly was a metallic blue 1953 Sunbeam Alpine Mk I.

=== Locations ===
To Catch a Thief was filmed largely in the Paramount Studios, Hollywood, California, and on location in the Alpes-Maritimes of southeastern France. It included the resorts of Cannes, Nice, Villefranche-sur-Mer, Saint-Jeannet and Tourrettes-sur-Loup.

Crucial to the film's success in shooting on location was the presence of unit production manager C.O. "Doc" Erickson. He had developed a reputation for his work on prior Paramount films that had relied on a great amount of location photography, such as Shane (1953) and Secret of the Incas (1954). Erickson thoroughly researched the logistics of shooting in the South of France and communicated with Bill Mull, the production manager on Little Boy Lost (1953).

== Distribution ==
To Catch a Thief is the only Hitchcock film released by Paramount that is still owned and controlled by the company. The other five films Hitchcock made at Paramount—Rear Window, The Trouble with Harry, The Man Who Knew Too Much, Vertigo, and Psycho—each passed from the studio to his personal ownership eight years after the date of their theatrical release, under the conditions of his contract. Those five are currently distributed by Universal Pictures.

== Reception ==
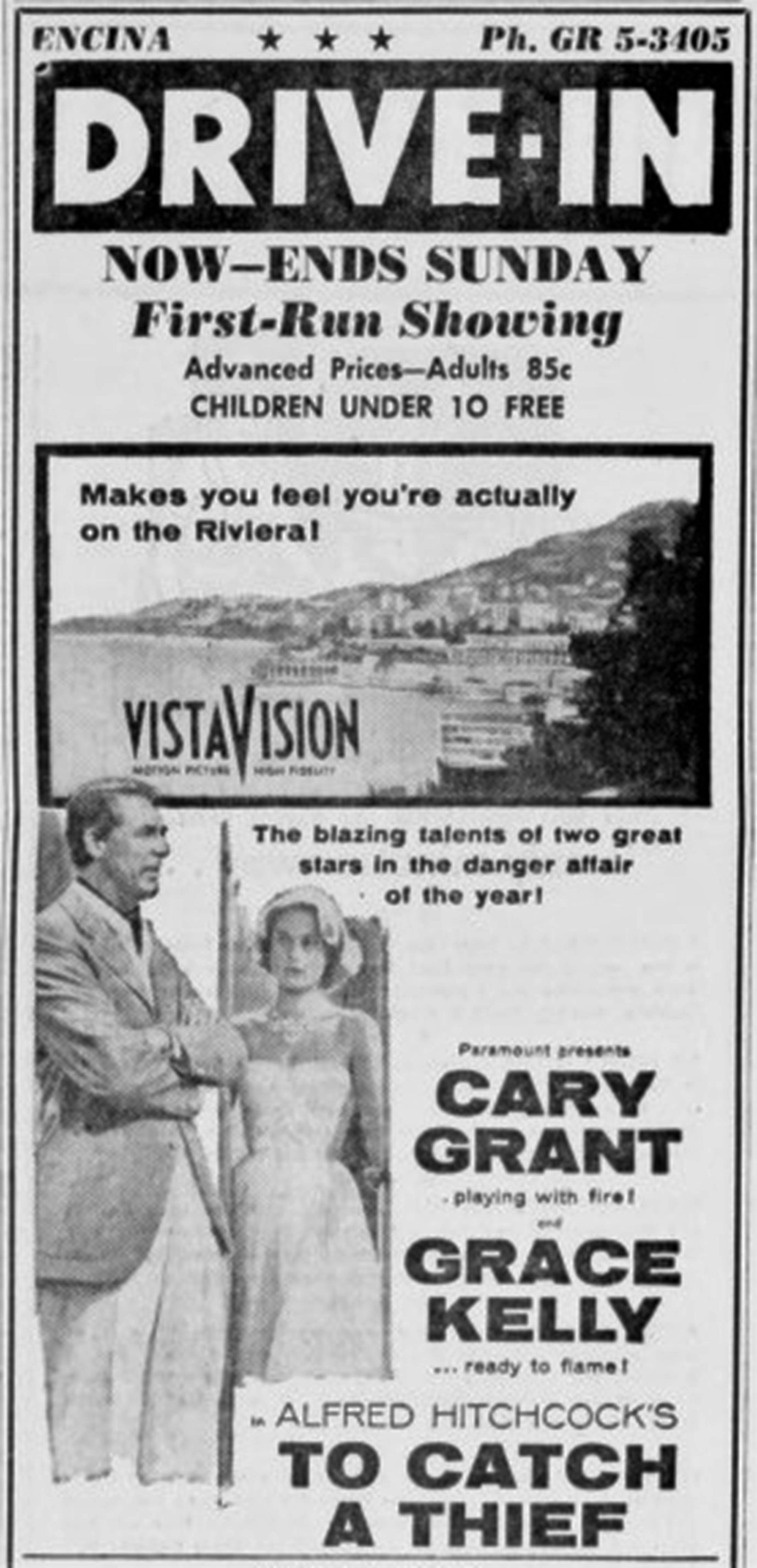
Drive-in advertisement from 1955

The film drew mixed reviews from critics, with some enjoying Grant and Kelly in the lead roles as well as the French Riviera setting, while others expressed disappointment at the lack of suspense compared to earlier Hitchcock films.

Bosley Crowther of The New York Times wrote in a positive review that the film "comes off completely as a hit in the old Hitchcock style ... Mr. Grant and Miss Kelly do grandly, especially in one sly seduction scene." Variety wrote that while the film was "not the suspense piece one usually associated with the Alfred Hitchcock name," it was "strong on sight and performance values" though it had "some plot weaknesses and is not as smooth in the unfolding as one might expect from an upper 'A' presentation."

Harrison's Reports wrote, "Alfred Hitchcock has not endowed the action with as much suspense as one might expect in a picture produced and directed by him; nevertheless, its story of a one-time jewel robber who sets out to establish his innocence by catching a thief who was using his technique is tight and swiftly-paced, and constantly offers dramatic and comical developments." Richard L. Coe of The Washington Post called it "one of those de luxe pictures in which everyone lives in glorious workless luxury on the French Rivera, looks wonderful, speaks amusingly and is unconcerned with transit strikes or hurricanes. I loved every minute of it."

Philip K. Scheuer of the Los Angeles Times was also positive, calling Grant and Kelly "ideal in the romantic leads" and the dialogue "daring but delightful," adding, "Above all, there is the spell of the French Riviera—a lazy, laissez-faire thing that apparently captivated the director as much as it will audiences in the soft, beguiling hues of its Technicolor and VistaVision."

John McCarten of The New Yorker dismissed the film as "an Alfred Hitchcock picture that makes you wonder what has happened to the man ... As the heiress, Grace Kelly is very pretty. She does not, presumably, try to act." The Monthly Film Bulletin wrote, "Even a comedy thriller needs considerably more in the way of plain excitement and tension than To Catch a Thief provides, and Hitchcock's celebrated habit of playing tricks with the audience ... seem a poor substitute for the real thing."

The Guardian called the film "a thorough disappointment," writing that Hitchcock had "failed so completely that one can only wonder if, in this tale of high-class burglary on the Côte d'Azur, he has not altogether abandoned his devotion to 'tension.' Certainly the 'whodunnit' element in this film is remarkably slack; the unmasking of the master criminal, which is the climax of the story, comes as mildly as bread and milk."

François Truffaut wrote "To Catch a Thief completely satisfies all [Hitchcock's] fans—the snobbiest and the most ordinary—and still manages to be one of the most cynical films Hitchcock has ever made."

On Rotten Tomatoes the film has an approval rating of 92% based on reviews from 53 critics, with an average rating of 7.9/10, with the critical consensus reading: "It may occasionally be guilty of coasting on pure charm, but To Catch a Thief has it in spades -- as well as a pair of perfectly matched stars in Cary Grant and Grace Kelly."

== Accolades ==
Robert Burks won the Academy Award for Best Cinematography, while Hal Pereira, Joseph McMillan Johnson, Samuel M. Comer and Arthur Krams were nominated for Best Art Direction, and Edith Head was nominated for Best Costume Design.

In 2002, American Film Institute included the film in AFI's 100 Years...100 Passions (#46).

== Adaptations ==
In May 2018, it was announced that Viacom was set to adapt the film as a Spanish-language television series. It was launched in October 2019 as Atrapa a un ladrón (es).

== Soundtracks ==
- Alfred Hitchcock's TO CATCH A THIEF (EP). With Francie's Theme, You'll Love France and Unexpected by Lyn Murray, as well as Your Kiss by George Cates & Georgie Auld. Conducted by Lyn Murray. Tenor Sax Solos by Georgie Auld. Coral Records EC 81083, USA 1955 and Coral Records CXP45-846 and Festival Records CXP45-846, Australia 1956.
- To Catch A Thief / The Bridges At Toko-Ri (CD) by Lyn Murray. 22 Tracks from "To Catch a Thief". Conducted by Lyn Murray. Recorded at Paramount Scoring Stage, Los Angeles, USA 1954. INTRADA Special Collection Volume 266, 2014.
- Serenade To A Princess - theme songs from the motion pictures made famous by GRACE KELLY (LP). With Francie's Theme by Lyn Murray and Your Kiss by George Cates & Georgie Auld. Conducted by David Carroll. Mercury Records MG 20156, USA 1956, Canada 1956.
- TO CATCH A THIEF - A HISTORY OF HITCHCOCK II (CD). With Paramount Vista Vision Fanfare by Nathan van Cleave and To Catch a Thief - Suite (You'll Love France / My Jewels / Red Convertible / Riviera Car Chase / Bus Stop / Finale) by Lyn Murray. Performed by The City of Prague Philharmonic Orchestra. Conducted by Paul Bateman. Recorded at Smecky Music Studios, Prague, Czech Republic. Silva Screen Records, USA 1995.
- Psycho - The Essential Alfred Hitchcock (2-CD-Set). With To Catch a Thief: Suite by Lyn Murray and Paramount Vista Vision Fanfare by Nathan van Cleave. Performed by The City of Prague Philharmonic Orchestra. Conducted by Paul Bateman. Recorded at Smecky Music Studios, Prague, Czech Republic. Silva Screen Records, FILMXCD 320, London 1999.

== See also ==
- List of American films of 1955

== Bibliography ==
- De Rosa, Steven (2001). Writing with Hitchcock: The Collaboration of Alfred Hitchcock and John Michael Hayes. Faber and Faber. ISBN 0571199909.
- Orengo, Nico (2006). La Guerra del Basilico (The Basil War (in Italian). Einaudi. ISBN 880618296X.
- Spoto, Donald (1999). The Dark Side of Genius. Da Capo. ISBN 0-306-80932-X.
- Vest, James M. (2003). Hitchcock and France: The Forging of an Auteur. Praeger. ISBN 0275970892.
