= To Catch a Thief (novel) =

1952 novel by David Dodge

- First edition cover
- Author: David Dodge
- Cover artist: Irving Miller
- Language: English
- Genre: Thriller
- Publisher: Random House
- Publication date: January 14, 1952
- Publication place: United States
- Media type: Print
- Pages: 248

To Catch a Thief is a 1952 thriller novel by David Dodge. The scene is the French Riviera, and the time is 1951.

== Plot ==
In August 1951, French police come to arrest American John Robie at his villa in Vence near the Côte d'Azur. He escapes, leaping over the garden wall. In the late 1930s, Robie was a daring, supremely athletic burglar, known as Le Chat ("the cat"), who specialized in jewel thefts from hotels and villas on the French Riviera. He was caught and sent to prison in 1939.

During the German occupation of France in World War II, the Germans released many convicts from French prisons, including Robie. He and many other released convicts joined the French Resistance (the Maquis), and fought against the Germans.

After the war, there was an unofficial amnesty for those released convicts who had been maquisards. Their previous sentences were not remitted, but as long as they refrained from new crimes they would be left alone. Some returned to underworld occupations, but Robie retired. He had saved some of the proceeds of his thefts, and did not need to steal. He bought his villa, tended his garden, and played boules with the townsfolk, including his friends Commissaire Oriol and Count Paul. He comforted Paul during the tragic death of his wife Lisa from tuberculosis.

Then in 1951, there were new jewel thefts on the Riviera, exactly in the style of Le Chat. Robie was suspected, but he assured Oriol that Le Chat was dead – killed in the Resistance. But after more thefts, Oriol's suspicion returned, and he tried to arrest Robie.

After escaping, Robie contacts Bellini in Cannes. Robie wants to leave France, but Bellini asks him to help catch the new Le Chat. The police are cracking down, threatening to send all the old ex-prisoners back to prison. The thief is using Robie's methods, so Robie can help them catch the thief, and get the police off their backs.

Jean-Pierre disguises Robie as a pudgy, middle-aged man. As "Jack Burns", vacationing American businessman, Robie scouts Riviera nightclubs and casinos. He identifies three likely targets for the new Le Chat: Mrs. Stevens, the Souzas, and the Sanfords. He works out Le Chat-style plans for burgling their residences. Unfortunately, Mrs. Stevens becomes attached to "Burns". He stands next to her in a casino (to study her jewelry), making small, cautious bets at roulette. Mrs. Stevens copies him with big bets, wins two million francs, and uses the money to buy a diamond dog pin with emerald eyes. She decides that "Lucky" Burns is her personal good-luck charm, buys him drinks, and copies his bets, attracting unwanted attention.

Bellini provides Robie with Danielle, a pretty girl to escort "Burns" in the casinos. This annoys Claude, Danielle's muscular would-be boyfriend, but keeps Mrs. Stevens away. "Burns" has also attracted the attention of Francie Stevens, who is suspicious of men who may want to exploit her trusting mother.

The thief strikes again, and Sûreté headquarters in Paris sends senior detective Lepic and additional agents. Mr. Paige announces an offer to buy back the jewels for 20% of their value – no questions asked. Then Robie encounters Count Paul in Cannes. Paul doesn't recognize him, but Robie has to stop his scouting. He dismisses Danielle.

Francie Stevens has guessed that "Burns" is Le Chat. She mistakenly thinks that he is the leader of a gang, which staged all the apparent feats of Le Chat. She is excited to meet a master thief, and suggests that he rob her mother, whose jewelry is insured, except the diamond dog, which must not be taken – even though this would be an obvious giveaway.

Bellini provides Robie with six tough ex-maquisards, including his old comrades Coco and Le Borgne. If they catch the thief and recover the jewels, they can share Paige's reward. Robie sets Coco and two men to watch the Souzas' cottage, and Le Borgne with two men to watch the Sanfords' chateau. He himself will watch in Mrs. Stevens' hotel. He has determined that the thief must strike by night.

That night, Mrs. Stevens goes out for an all-night gambling session, wearing most of her jewels. Francie (wearing the rest) has Robie take her out for the night. He complies, since there is nothing for the thief to steal. But Mrs. Stevens loses her stake quickly and comes home early. After she goes to sleep, the thief strikes.

Count Paul is among the crowd attracted by the alarm over the theft, and recognizes Robie. Paul won't expose him, but he wants an introduction to Danielle. She reminds him of his beloved Lisa, and he must meet her. Robie tells him who she is, but deliberately rejects Paul's offer to help him.

Francie thinks Robie's gang stole the jewels. She demands the return of the diamond dog, threatening to expose him. Robie plays for time. Robie thinks that perhaps Danielle, who is clever, and Claude, who is athletic, are behind the thefts. Bellini investigates, and clears Claude.

At the Souzas' cottage, Coco dismisses one of his crew, a quarrelsome Romani, and Robie joins him on watch. The next day, at the beach, he introduces Paul to Danielle. Later, Robie tells her about Lisa.

Francie again pressures Robie for the diamond dog, and he tells her the whole story; also, how he came to be Le Chat. His parents were circus acrobats, as was he. Orphaned when young, he came to Europe, was stranded, and took to burglary.

Two nights later, Robie spots a figure sneaking away from the Souza cottage. Then Detective Lepic shoots the man dead. It is the Romani, who tried to use Robie's Le Chat-style planning. This seems to exonerate Le Chat, but the stolen jewels are still missing. Robie is certain that the Romani was not athletic enough to be the hotel thief. The thief is still at large, and will strike again.

The target will be the Sanfords. The next weekend is their gala house party, and the guests will bring fabulous jewels. Francie wangles an invitation for "Burns". But Count Paul is also a guest. Paul demands that Robie leave, and won't listen to his explanation. Lepic and Oriol also arrive to protect the guests' jewels.

Robie abandons his disguise and lies in wait for the thief on the roof of the chateau. Late that night, he pursues the thief over the roof. The police are aroused, and Oriol demands Robie's surrender. Robie catches up with the thief, who is Danielle. Reflexively, he joins her in evading the police. They slip through the window of Paul's room. Paul hides them from Oriol, and now listens to Robie's story. Danielle too was a hungry young orphan acrobat. She deliberately mimicked the famous Le Chat, and never recognized "Burns" until they met on the roof.

Paul, who is in love with Danielle, asks her to marry him. He can pay what is required to save her freedom. But Robie has a better idea – since she still has the stolen jewels, Danielle and Bellini take the jewels to Paige, who tells Oriol and Lepic that the jewels have been returned and "Burns" was his company's agent. With the jewels restored and the Romani dead, the case is closed.

Robie can now return safely to Vence, where he has everything he wants – except, he now realizes, Francie Stevens. He finds her packing to leave for America.

== Characters ==
- John Robie, an American living in Vence near the French Riviera; once a famous jewel thief, and then a Resistance fighter (maquisard), now retired.
- Count Paul du Pré de la Tour, Robie's wealthy, widowed neighbor and friend, living in Grasse.
- Commissaire Oriol, head of police in Vence.
- Bellini, ex-maquisard comrade of Robie, small businessman and fringe criminal in Cannes.
- Jean-Pierre, ex-maquisard comrade of Robie, and fence in Marseille.
- Coco, ex-maquisard comrade of Robie, and crook in Cannes.
- Le Borgne, ex-maquisard comrade of Robie, and crook in Cannes.
- The Romani, ex-maquisard, and burglar in Cannes.
- Michel, ex-maquisard and crook in Cannes.
- Mrs. Maude Stevens, wealthy, flamboyant American widow.
- Francie Stevens, her daughter.
- Danielle, an employee of Bellini's beach concession.
- Claude, swimming instructor at Bellini's beach concession.
- Mr. Paige, representative of the British company which insured most of the jewels.
- Commissaire divisionnaire Lepic, sent down from Paris.
- Mr. and Mrs. Sanford, wealthy American residents of Cannes.
- Senhor and Senhora Souza, wealthy Brazilian residents of Cannes.

== Adaptations ==
In 1955, the novel was made into a film by Alfred Hitchcock, starring Cary Grant and Grace Kelly.

In 1963, the premise of a jewel thief who must come out of retirement was adapted in the caper-comedy, The Pink Panther.

Episode 10 of Season 10 of the TV series Bones (December 11, 2014), "The 200 in the 10th", is a free adaptation of the novel, with the show characters appearing as in a movie set in the 1950s.

In 2011, the novel was dramatized as a Saturday Play, which was broadcast on 8 January on BBC Radio 4.

In 2022, the underlying eights were obtained from the Estate of David Dodge by composer by Kevin Purcell to adapt into a musical with Peter Sham writing book and lyrics.

== Predecessors ==
Short story about A. J. Raffles by E. W. Hornung "To Catch a Thief" (1899) tells the story of how Raffles, a retired gentleman thief, attempts to catch another high-society jewel thief whom the press is calling by Raffles's name.

== Publication history ==
=== Editions ===
- New York: Random House, 1952. 248 pp. [1st ed.]
- New York: Dell Publishing Company, 1953 (Dell 658). 224 pp.
- London: Michael Joseph, 1953. [1st UK ed.]
- Harmondsworth, Middlesex: Penguin Books, 1955 (Penguin 1053). 215, [1] pp.
- London: White Lion Publishers Limited, 1972. 215, [1] pp. ISBN 0-85617-803-9
- London; Melbourne: J.M. Dent & Sons, 1988 (Mastercrime). 200 pp. ISBN 0-460-12557-5
- Eugene, OR: Bruin Books, 2010 (Bruin Crimeworks). ix, 281 pp. ISBN 978-0-9826339-3-9

=== Condensed/abridged versions ===
- Book publication was preceded by a version of the novel that appeared in the December 1951 issue of Cosmopolitan (Vol. 131, no. 6)
- In Reader's Digest Condensed Books, Winter 1952 Selections. Pleasantville, N.Y.: Reader's Digest Association, 1952, p. 397-503
- In Reader's Digest Condensed Books. London: Reader's Digest Association, [1956?], p. 409-503
- In Anthology of Mystery and Suspense. Pleasantville, N.Y.: Reader's Digest Association, 1959 (Reader's Digest Book Club), p. 224-315
- In The Golden Age of Film: Four Novels That Captivated Hollywood. Ultimo, N.S.W.: Reader's Digest Australia, 2009.
