= Alfred Hitchcock filmography =

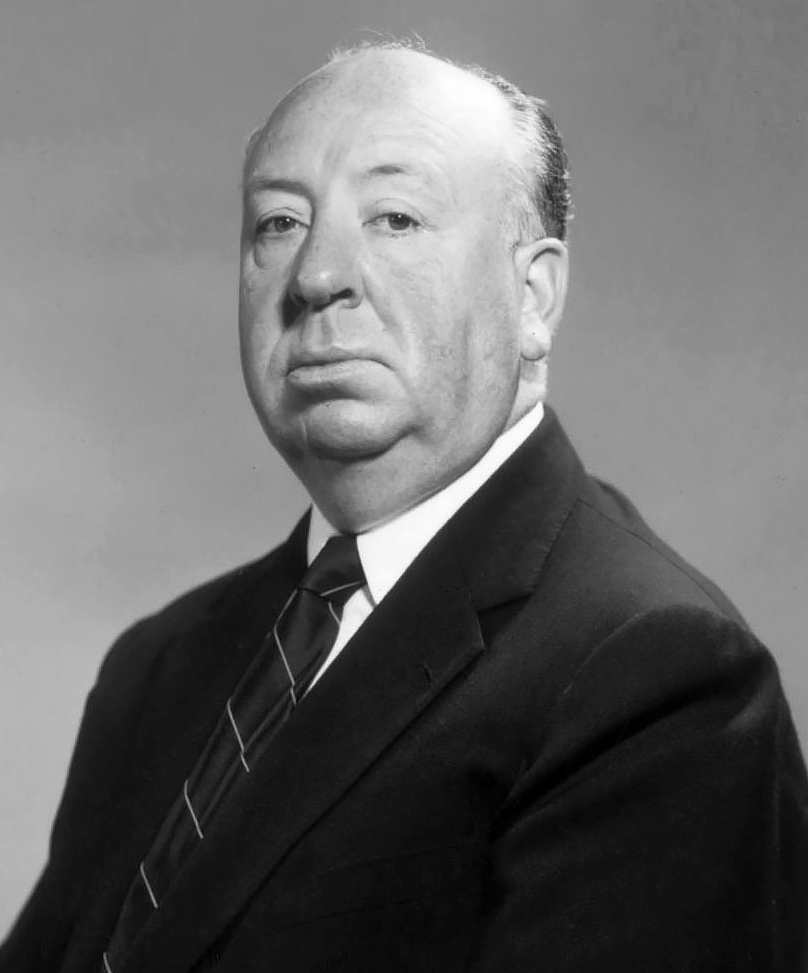
Studio publicity photo of Hitchcock in 1955

Alfred Hitchcock (1899–1980) was an English director and filmmaker. Popularly known as the "Master of Suspense" for his use of innovative film techniques in thrillers, Hitchcock started his career in the British film industry as a title designer and art director for a number of silent films during the early 1920s. His directorial debut was the 1925 release The Pleasure Garden. Hitchcock followed this with The Lodger: A Story of the London Fog, his first commercial and critical success. It featured many of the thematic elements his films would be known for, such as an innocent man on the run. It also featured the first of his famous cameo appearances. Two years later he directed Blackmail (1929) which was his first sound film. In 1935, Hitchcock directed The 39 Steps; three years later, he directed The Lady Vanishes, starring Margaret Lockwood and Michael Redgrave.

In 1940, Hitchcock transitioned to Hollywood productions, the first of which was the psychological thriller Rebecca, starring Laurence Olivier and Joan Fontaine. He received his first nomination for the Academy Award for Best Director, and the film won Best Picture. Hitchcock worked with Fontaine again the following year on the film Suspicion, which also starred Cary Grant. In 1943, Hitchcock directed another psychological thriller Shadow of a Doubt, which starred Teresa Wright and Joseph Cotten. Three years later, he reunited with Grant on Notorious, which also starred Ingrid Bergman. The film included a three-minute intermittent kissing scene between the leads shot specifically to skirt the Motion Picture Production Code which at the time limited such scenes to three seconds. In 1948, Hitchcock directed Rope, which starred James Stewart. The film was his first in Technicolor and is remembered for its use of long takes to make the film appear to be a single continuous shot. Three years later, he directed Strangers on a Train (1951).

Hitchcock collaborated with Grace Kelly on three films: Dial M for Murder (1954), Rear Window (1954) and To Catch a Thief (1955). For Rear Window, Hitchcock received a nomination for Best Director at the Academy Awards. 1955 marked his debut on television as the host of the anthology television series Alfred Hitchcock Presents, which he also produced. In 1958, Hitchcock directed the psychological thriller Vertigo, starring Stewart and Kim Novak. The film topped the 2012 poll of the British film magazine Sight & Sound of the 50 Greatest Films of All Time and also topped the American Film Institute's Top Ten in the mystery genre. He followed this with the spy thriller North by Northwest (1959), which starred Grant and Eva Marie Saint. In 1960, he directed Psycho, the biggest commercial success of his career and for which he received his fifth nomination for Best Director at the Academy Awards. Three years later, he directed the horror film The Birds, starring Tippi Hedren. The following year, he reunited with Hedren on Marnie, which also starred Sean Connery.

In recognition of his career, Hitchcock garnered the British Academy of Film and Television Arts (BAFTA) Fellowship Award, the American Film Institute's Life Achievement Award, the Irving G. Thalberg Memorial Award, the Directors Guild of America's Lifetime Achievement Award and the Golden Globe Cecil B. DeMille Award. He received two stars on the Hollywood Walk of Fame to acknowledge his film and television achievements. In 1980, Hitchcock received a knighthood.

== Film ==
=== As director ===
Year	Title	Credited as			Notes	Ref(s)
Year	Title	Director	Producer	Writer	Notes	Ref(s)
1922	Number 13	Yes	No	No	Lost film • Unfinished	
1925	The Pleasure Garden	Yes	No	No	German title: Irrgarten der Leidenschaft (Maze of Passion)	
1926	The Mountain Eagle	Yes	No	No	Lost film German title: Der Bergadler	
1927	The Lodger: A Story of the London Fog	Yes	No	No	American title: The Case of Jonathan Drew	
1927	The Ring	Yes	No	Yes	Screenplay writer	
1927	Downhill	Yes	No	No	American title: When Boys Leave Home	
1928	The Farmer's Wife	Yes	No	No		
1928	Easy Virtue	Yes	No	No		
1928	Champagne	Yes	No	Yes	Screenplay co-writer	
1929	The Manxman	Yes	No	No		
1929	Blackmail	Yes	No	Yes	Released in both silent and sound versions	
1930	An Elastic Affair	Yes	No	No	Short film Lost film	
1930	Juno and the Paycock	Yes	No	Yes	Screenplay co-writer	
1930	Murder!	Yes	No	Yes	Screenplay co-writer	
1931	The Skin Game	Yes	No	Yes	Screenplay co-writer	
1931	Mary	Yes	No	No	German-language version of Murder! filmed with German actors	
1931	Rich and Strange	Yes	No	Yes	American title: East of Shanghai; Screenplay co-writer	
1932	Number Seventeen	Yes	No	Yes	Screenplay co-writer	
1934	Waltzes from Vienna	Yes	No	No	American title: Strauss' Great Waltz/ The Strauss Waltz	
1934	The Man Who Knew Too Much	Yes	No	No		
1935	The 39 Steps	Yes	No	No		
1936	Secret Agent	Yes	No	No		
1936	Sabotage	Yes	No	No	American title: The Woman Alone	
1937	Young and Innocent	Yes	No	No	American title: The Girl Was Young	
1938	The Lady Vanishes	Yes	No	No		
1939	Jamaica Inn	Yes	No	No		
1940	Rebecca	Yes	No	No		
1940	Foreign Correspondent	Yes	No	No		
1941	Mr. & Mrs. Smith	Yes	No	No		
1941	Suspicion	Yes	No	No		
1942	Saboteur	Yes	No	No		
1943	Shadow of a Doubt	Yes	No	No		
1944	Lifeboat	Yes	No	No		
1944	The Fighting Generation	Yes	No	No	United States propaganda short	
1945	Spellbound	Yes	No	No		
1946	Notorious	Yes	Yes	No		
1947	The Paradine Case	Yes	No	No		
1948	Rope	Yes	Yes	No	Co-producer	
1949	Under Capricorn	Yes	Yes	No	Co-producer	
1950	Stage Fright	Yes	Yes	No		
1951	Strangers on a Train	Yes	Yes	No		
1953	I Confess	Yes	Yes	No		
1954	Dial M for Murder	Yes	Yes	No	Filmed in 3D	
1954	Rear Window	Yes	Yes	No		
1955	To Catch a Thief	Yes	Yes	No		
1955	The Trouble with Harry	Yes	Yes	No		
1956	The Man Who Knew Too Much	Yes	Yes	No	Remake of Hitchcock's 1934 movie of the same name	
1956	The Wrong Man	Yes	Yes	No		
1958	Vertigo	Yes	Yes	No		
1959	North by Northwest	Yes	Yes	No		
1960	Psycho	Yes	Yes	No		
1963	The Birds	Yes	Yes	No		
1964	Marnie	Yes	Yes	No		
1966	Torn Curtain	Yes	Yes	No		
1969	Topaz	Yes	Yes	No		
1972	Frenzy	Yes	Yes	No		
1976	Family Plot	Yes	Yes	No		
1993	Bon Voyage	Yes	No	No	French-language propaganda short Filmed in 1944 but only released in 1993	
1993	Aventure Malgache	Yes	No	No	French-language propaganda short Filmed in 1944 but only released in 1993	

=== Other work ===
Year	Title	Credited as			Notes	Ref(s)
Year	Title	Producer	Writer	Other	Notes	Ref(s)
1920	The Great Day	No	No	Yes	Title designer • Short film • Lost film	
1921	The Call of Youth	No	No	Yes	Title designer • Short film • Lost film	
1921	Appearances	No	No	Yes	Title designer • Lost film	
1921	The Mystery Road	No	No	Yes	Title designer • Lost film	
1921	The Princess of New York	No	No	Yes	Title designer • Lost film	
1921	Dangerous Lies	No	No	Yes	Title designer • Lost film	
1921	The Bonnie Brier Bush	No	No	Yes	Title designer • Lost film	
1922	Three Live Ghosts	No	No	Yes	Art director, and title designer	
1922	Love's Boomerang	No	No	Yes	Title designer • Lost film	
1922	The Spanish Jade	No	No	Yes	Art director, and title designer • Lost film	
1922	The Man from Home	No	No	Yes	Art director, and title designer	
1922	Tell Your Children	No	No	Yes	Art director, and title designer • Lost film	
1923	Always Tell Your Wife	No	No	Yes	Co-director (uncredited), and production manager • Short film • Partially lost film	
1923	Woman to Woman	No	Yes	Yes	Assistant director, screenplay co-writer, and art director • Lost film	
1923	The White Shadow	No	Yes	Yes	US title: White Shadows; Assistant director, screenplay co-writer, and art director Partially lost film	
1924	The Passionate Adventure	No	Yes	Yes	Assistant director, screenplay co-writer, and art director	
1925	The Blackguard	No	Yes	Yes	German title: Die Prinzessin und der Geiger (The Princess and the Violinist); Assistant director, screenplay writer, and art director	
1925	The Prude's Fall	No	Yes	Yes	US title: Dangerous Virtue; Assistant director, screenplay writer, and art director Partially lost film	
1930	Elstree Calling	No	No	Yes	Sketches, and other interpolated items	
1932	Lord Camber's Ladies	Yes	No	No		
2014	German Concentration Camps Factual Survey	No	No	Yes	Treatment advisor Documentary; Filmed in 1945 but only released in 2014	

== Television ==
Year(s)	Title	Role	Notes	Ref(s)
1955–1962	Alfred Hitchcock Presents	Host	17 episodes (director)	
1957	Suspicion	—	Episode: "Four O'Clock" (director, and producer)	
1960	Startime	—	Episode: "Incident at a Corner" (director, and producer); Only television show directed by Hitchcock in colour	
1962	Alcoa Premiere	—	Episode: "The Jail" (executive producer)	
1962–1965	The Alfred Hitchcock Hour	Host	Episode: "I Saw The Whole Thing" (director)	

== See also ==
- Alfred Hitchcock's unrealized projects
- List of awards and nominations received by Alfred Hitchcock
- Remakes of films by Alfred Hitchcock
