= Alfred Hitchcock's unrealized projects =

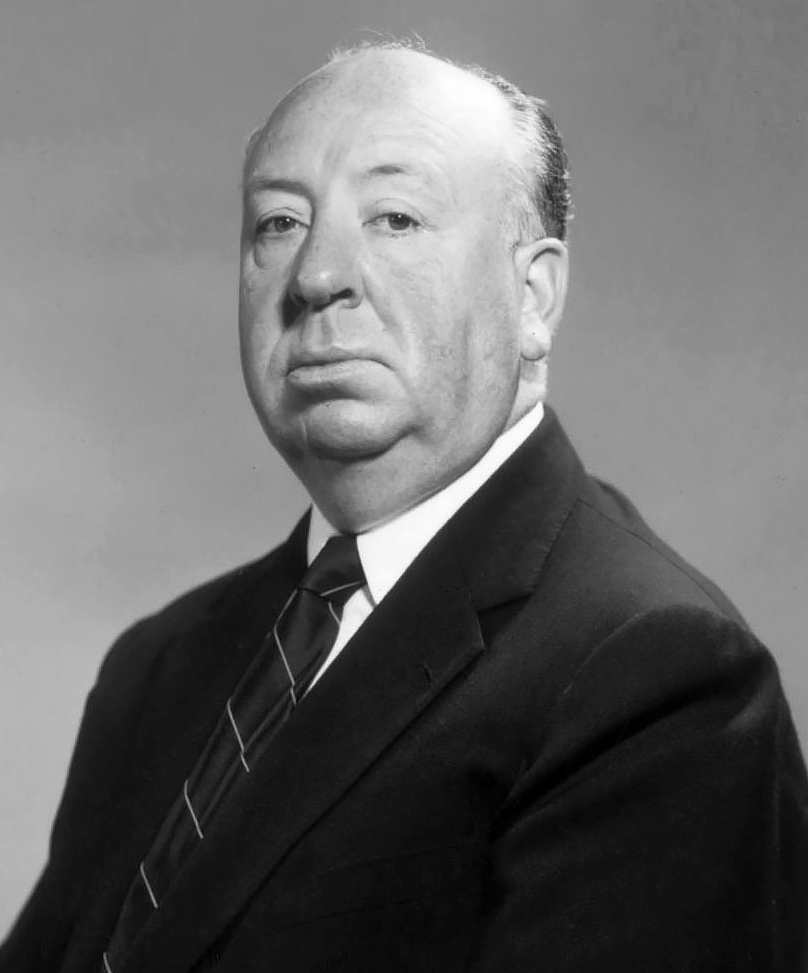
Hitchcock c. 1960s

During a career that spanned more than half a century, Alfred Hitchcock directed over fifty films, and worked on a number of others which never made it beyond the pre-production stage.

== 1920s ==
=== Number 13 ===
This was to be Hitchcock's directorial debut, after working in the art department on twelve films previously, but budgetary problems cancelled the production after only a few scenes were shot. Studio records indicate that its title was to be Mrs. Peabody.

=== Good Night, Nurse! ===
In 1922, Hitchcock hand-wrote Good Night, Nurse!, an eight-page draft treatment for an original screenplay. It is said to be the earliest known surviving piece of original screen writing by Hitchcock. No film was made from the material.

=== Huntingtower ===
In 1926, the Scottish press reported that Hitchcock was visiting to scout locations for an adaptation of John Buchan's 1922 novel Huntingtower. Carlyle Blackwell, who had produced The Lodger: A Story of the London Fog (1927), was named as the lead actor.

=== Life of a City ===
According to Hitchcock, since 1928 he had wanted to film an idea of his called Life of a City. He told Peter Bogdanovich: "I want to do it in terms of what lies behind the face of a city—what makes it tick—in other words, backstage of a city. But it's so enormous that it is practically impossible to get the story right. Two or three people had a go at it for me but all failed. It must be done in terms of personalities and people, and with my techniques, everything would have to be used dramatically."

=== Tambourine ===
In March 1929, The Times newspaper announced that Hitchcock would be directing Tambourine for British International Pictures, based on a screenplay by Benn Levy. The following month, Variety reported that Hitchcock would follow Juno and the Paycock (1930) with Tambourine.

== 1930s ==
=== The Park ===
After completing Juno and the Paycock (1930), playwright Seán O'Casey and Hitchcock began planning an original screenplay, The Park, based on the "comings and goings in a small public park during one day as a sort of microcosm of city life". The planned project came to nothing and, instead, O'Casey used the idea for his 1934 play Within the Gates.

=== The Man at Six ===
In October 1930, British International Pictures announced their upcoming schedule of films, which included two linked to Hitchcock; The Man at Six and Rich and Strange (both 1931). The Man at Six ended up being assigned to director Harry Hughes.

=== The Return of Bulldog Drummond ===
In January 1933, it was announced that Hitchcock was to direct a film based on the popular H. C. McNeile Bulldog Drummond book series for British International Pictures, tentatively titled The Return of Bulldog Drummond.

=== Forbidden Territory ===
British thriller writer Dennis Wheatley had been a guest on the set of many of the early Hitchcock movies, and when The Forbidden Territory was published in January 1933, he presented the director with a copy. Hitchcock so enjoyed the book that he wanted to make a film of it, but he was just in the process of moving to Gaumont-British studios to work for Michael Balcon, he asked Wheatley to hold onto the rights until he could persuade his new employer to purchase them. When the time came, however, Balcon wasn't interested and instead insisted that Hitchcock direct the musical Waltzes from Vienna (1934). Hitchcock then approached Richard Wainwright, a distinguished producer who had been head of UFA films in Germany, and had recently relocated to Britain. Wainwright was keen to pick up a promising subject for his first British film, and immediately bought the rights. Although there was a verbal understanding that Hitchcock was to direct, Balcon refused to release him, and instead began production of The Man Who Knew Too Much (1934). Wainwright, committed to studio space, technicians and actors, had no alternative but to proceed without him, and placed the film into the hands of American director Phil Rosen. In 1936, at Hitchcock's instigation, Wheatley wrote a screenplay The Bombing of London, but the controversial project could find no backer and was shelved.

=== Road House ===
It was announced that Hitchcock would be directing Road House (1934), based on the play by Walter C. Hackett. The released film was instead directed by Maurice Elvey.

=== London Symphony ===
In March 1935, several publications carried brief details about a planned film titled London Symphony, which would star actor Clive Brook and be directed by Hitchcock. The scenario was to be written by H. M. Harwood and based on an original story by Sir Philip Gibbs and his son Anthony.

=== Derby Day ===
On December 17, 1935, The Times reported that a film about the annual Epsom Derby horse race was to be directed by Hitchcock for the Gaumont-British Corporation, written by himself. On December 21, the Lancashire Evening Post indicated that he would begin the film after finishing Sabotage (1936) and specified that "the whole of the action will take place in the ninety minutes after the luncheon interval of the renowned race meeting; the story being the effects of the event on a variety of characters." On December 28, Sunderland Daily Echo and Shipping Gazette referred to Derby Day as one of the director's "most cherished ambitions". Speaking of the possibilities of such a film—and illustrating his ideas via quick sketches—Hitchcock began: "Think of the opportunities of the subject. You have the Downs, covered by the great town of temporary structures which rise up in a night, fortune-tellers' stalls, tea-tents, restaurant marquees, cloakrooms, offices, the vast crowd, in which princes and peasants mingle: the mass of buses ... even the Salvation Army meetings."

In a 1937 article for Sight and Sound magazine, Hitchcock wrote, "I certainly should like to make a film of the Derby, only it might not be quite in the popular class. It would be hard to invent a Derby story that wasn't hackneyed, conventional. I would rather do it more as a documentary — a sort of pageant, an animated modern version of Frith's Derby Day. I would show everything that goes on all round the course, but without a story. Perhaps the average audience isn't ready for that, yet. Popular taste, all the same, does move; today you can put over scenes that would have been ruled out a few years ago." Hitchcock again mentioned the project to The New York Times in 1939: "Can there be anything more exciting or dramatic than a million people all gathered together in one afternoon — all sorts of people, from top to bottom - just to witness the running of a race? I always liken it to the Judgment Day. Well, I should like to sift, say, a dozen characters from that crowd and, within the limits of an hour and a half on that fatal afternoon, tell their stories, climaxed by the finish of the race."

In his biography of Hitchcock, Patrick McGilligan stated:

Even at age seventy-eight, working on the last script of his career, the director liked to recall Derby Day at Epsom Downs, where, as a boy, he noticed the enterprising children who dug holes in the ground and put up little tents, charging people for "the right to relieve" themselves. In Cockney singsong, Hitchcock digressed from scriptwork to imitate the twelve-year-old girls advertising, "Accommodations, one penny, accommodations, one penny," and the rougher sorts of boys who touted the same service for "A piddle and a poop, one penny." ("Of course, when the food was bad," Hitchcock told writer David Freeman, "they did quite well.")

=== False Witness ===
An August 1937 article in Variety noted that Hitchcock was obligated to complete two more films to fulfill his Gaumont-British contract after Young and Innocent (1937). The first was reported to be another Nova Pilbeam starrer, adapted from a French short story by Marcel Achard. Production was expected to be under way by November. Three months later, the script was complete and given the tentative title of The False Witness. In May the following year, in a piece listing twenty-four upcoming Gaumont-British films that would be released in the U.S., the Independent Exhibitors Film Bulletin named the project as Perjury.

According to biographer Patrick McGilligan:

...anxious to settle on a new project, [Hitchcock], his wife, and Joan Harrison spent their spare time brainstorming stories. Hitchcock told the press they were working on a script called False Witness, intended for Young and Innocent star Nova Pilbeam, which involved "her con-man father and alibis." If that didn't work out, he had another film in mind, "based on a pet theme of his." He said he'd nurtured "a long-felt desire to take a comic situation and suddenly switch to tragedy — to experiment on the effect of slapstick under fairly sane conditions." He thought he might open a film "with a half-dozen Keystone cops crawling out of a tunnel, while a thug stands over the exit with a club and hits each one coming out. Wouldn't it be interesting to show a close-up of the sixth cop with blood trickling down his face — comedy suddenly turned sober — and then cut to a picture of his family in agony over his misfortune?"

Instead, the studio offered Hitchcock the existing Lost Lady project—released as The Lady Vanishes (1938)—which he accepted.

=== The Saint in New York ===
In 1937, Hitchcock showed interest to Lillie Messinger of RKO Pictures in coming to America to make The Saint in New York (1938). Ben Holmes directed, and Hitchcock would go on to make Foreign Correspondent (1940) as his American film debut instead.

=== Untitled Edgar Wallace biopic ===
In January 1939, Hitchcock was set to direct Sam Smith's ambitious production on the life of English writer Edgar Wallace for British Lion, budgeted at $350,000 and scheduled to begin work on March 1 of that year. Ralph Richardson was announced in the title role.

=== Intermezzo ===
In February 1939, it was announced that Hitchcock would be directing the David O. Selznick production of Intermezzo. Instead, the film was directed by Gregory Ratoff.

=== The Flashing Stream ===
In March 1939, it was reported that Hitchcock would be directing an adaptation of Charles Langbridge Morgan's The Flashing Stream for David O. Selznick, with reports in July listing comedic actress Carole Lombard as the female lead. The New York Times indicated in October that Hitchcock would return to Selznick, after he completes Foreign Correspondent (1940), to direct two films, Titanic and The Flashing Stream.

=== Greenmantle ===
Hitchcock very much wanted to direct a follow-up to The 39 Steps (1935), and he felt that Greenmantle by John Buchan was a superior book. He proposed that the film would star Cary Grant and Ingrid Bergman, but the rights from the Buchan estate proved too expensive.

=== Titanic ===
Hitchcock remarked in a British film journal interview just before leaving for Hollywood that he hoped to make a film about the tragic loss of RMS Titanic. The inherent drama of the ocean liner's sinking appealed to him. Indeed, it was to be the first production of Hitchcock’s new contract under David O. Selznick, who had long wished to make a lavish telling of the event. Several problems complicated its genesis, including conflicts with legalities, objections from the British shipping industry, and competing plans from other producers. Both Hitchcock and Selznick eventually became disenchanted with the project and they proceeded with Rebecca (1940) instead.

== 1940s ==
=== Escape ===
Hitchcock desperately wanted to direct Norma Shearer, Robert Taylor, and Conrad Veidt in one of the first World War II dramas, Escape (1940). Hitchcock, a long-time admirer of Shearer's acting, had sought for years to find a suitable project for her. However, Hitchcock was shut out of the project when the novel Escape by Ethel Vance (pen name of Grace Zaring Stone) was purchased by Metro-Goldwyn-Mayer. Hitchcock knew he could never work for the notorious MGM studio head Louis B. Mayer, who selected Mervyn LeRoy to produce and direct the film, which indeed starred Shearer and was released in late 1940. Years later, Hitchcock made the statement about the lack of true Hollywood leading ladies with the quote, "Where are the Norma Shearers?"

=== The Bat ===
In April 1940, Variety reported that David O. Selznick might loan Hitchcock out to producer James Roosevelt at United Artists to direct The Bat. The following month, The New York Times reported the film had been shelved, "because of the unavailability of Alfred Hitchcock".

=== Untitled Gene Kelly project ===
In August 1941, Variety reported that Hitchcock would be directing Gene Kelly's first film for Selznick International. Ultimately, Selznick was unable to find a suitable project and instead sold half of Kelly's contract to MGM.

=== Frenchman's Creek ===
In September 1941, Variety reported that Hitchcock attempted to secure the film rights to the historical novel Frenchman's Creek by Daphne du Maurier. Set in Cornwall during the reign of Charles II, it tells the story of a love affair between an impulsive English lady and a French pirate, but his offer was rejected. The novel was eventually adapted into the 1944 Paramount film, directed by Mitchell Leisen.

=== The Keys of the Kingdom ===
In April 1943, the Los Angeles Times linked Hitchcock to the 20th Century Fox production The Keys of the Kingdom. The film had initially been planned by David O. Selznick who then sold the project to Fox, along with Gregory Peck, who had recently signed to Selznick. According to some sources, although Hitchcock was genuinely interested in filming Cronin's novel for Fox, it was Lifeboat (1944) that held the greater appeal for the director. The film was instead directed by John M. Stahl.

=== Untitled Nazi documentary ===
In 1945, Hitchcock was brought in as a supervising director for a documentary film about Nazi crimes and Nazi concentration camps. The film was originally to include segments produced by military film units from the United Kingdom, the United States, France, and the Soviet Union. Cold War developments meant that the USSR segment was withdrawn, and the film remained uncompleted, with some footage kept in the collection of the Imperial War Museum.

However, a reconstruction of the film was aired as Memory of the Camps in 1984–1985 in the United Kingdom and the United States. The United States version was shown on the PBS series Frontline on May 7, 1985. In October 2014, a new documentary about the unfinished film, Night Will Fall, premiered at the BFI London Film Festival.

=== Hamlet ===
According to biographer Caroline Moorehead, during the summer of 1945, Hitchcock had pitched to Sidney Bernstein the idea of Transatlantic Pictures' first film being a modern re-telling of William Shakespeare's Hamlet, starring Cary Grant in the title role. In a cable to Bernstein, Hitchcock described it as being a "psychological melodrama" and that Grant was keen to take on the role. The project was scrapped when Hitchcock's studio caught wind of a potential lawsuit from a professor who had already written a modern-day version of Hamlet.

=== Operation Annie ===
In March 1946, the Monthly Film Bulletin reported that after being set to direct The Paradine Case (1946) for David O. Selznick, Hitchcock had bought the rights to Major Patrick Dolan's story "Operation Annie", which he planned to make for his own Transatlantic Pictures production banner. The story is about the secret work of Radio Luxembourg during the war.

=== The Life of Keir Hardie ===
In May 1946, a film project on the life of British Labour Party founder Keir Hardie was briefly proposed for Transatlantic Pictures; announced in Variety with Hitchcock's attachment as director.

=== Weep No More ===
In March 1947, Monthly Film Bulletin reported that Cary Grant would star in the RKO production Weep No More and that the studio were keen for Hitchcock to direct. The following month, Hitchcock was confirmed to be directing. The film was eventually made as Walk Softly, Stranger (1950), directed by Robert Stevenson and starring Joseph Cotten.

=== King Lear ===
In March 1948, the Yorkshire Evening Post reported that Hitchcock "hopes to produce" a version of King Lear in England, with Orson Welles in the lead.

=== Dark Duty ===
On October 8, 1948, Hitchcock's representative Albert Margolies told The New York Times that once the director had completed Under Capricorn (1949), one of his next projects would be Dark Duty, based on the 1931 novel by Margaret Wilson which chronicles an innocent man who is sentenced to death. According to Patrick McGilligan, Wilson knew Hitchcock wanted to buy the rights to the novel and she pushed up the asking price so high that the project became financially unviable. The Los Angeles Times reported that Hitchcock's next film after I Confess (1953) would be Dark Duty, "which will be made in France".

=== The Spider and the Fly ===
Albert Margolies also announced in October 1948 that upon completion of Under Capricorn (1949), Hitchcock would next direct The Spider and the Fly (1949), in addition to I Confess and Dark Duty. Robert Hamer took the helm instead.

=== Lorna Doone ===
On October 25, 1948, Hitchcock announced plans to film the H. D. Blackmore novel Lorna Doone for Transatlantic Pictures. However, American producer Edward Small had previously registered the film title in the U.S. and told Hitchcock he would not be able to release his version in America as Lorna Doone.

== 1950s ==
=== The Bramble Bush ===
The Bramble Bush would have been an adaptation of a 1948 novel by David Duncan about a disaffected Communist agitator who, on the run from the police, is forced to adopt the identity of a murder suspect. The story would be adapted to take place in Mexico and San Francisco.

The project, originally to come after I Confess (1953) as a Transatlantic Pictures production to be released by Warner Bros., had a high budget which made it a difficult project. Hitchcock did not feel that any of the scripts lifted the movie beyond an ordinary chase story, and Warner Brothers allowed him to kill the project and move on to Dial M for Murder (1954).

The theme of the hero assuming a dangerous new identity would become the kernel of the script for North by Northwest (1959). Michelangelo Antonioni's film The Passenger (1975) tells a similar story, but is not based on Duncan's book. The 1960 film The Bramble Bush, starring Richard Burton and Barbara Rush, and released by Warner Bros., was based on a Charles Mergendahl novel, and had no relation to Duncan's book.

=== She Who Was No More ===
According to film historian Susan Hayward, Hitchcock missed out on purchasing the film rights to 1952's Celle qui n'était plus, by French crime fiction writing duo Boileau-Narcejac, by just a few hours. Henri-Georges Clouzot, who had just finished The Wages of Fear (1953), got to the authors first and optioned the rights, preventing Hitchcock from making a film of the story. Clouzot's adaptation, Diabolique (1955), was a critical and commercial success.

=== Breakdown ===
In May 1955, the Los Angeles Times reported that Hitchcock had just purchased the screen rights to Louis Pollock's story "Breakdown", and was planning to turn it into a feature-length film once The Man Who Knew Too Much (1956) had been completed. Instead, it was adapted as a November 1955 episode for Alfred Hitchcock Presents.

=== Flamingo Feather ===
This was to be a big-budget adaptation of Laurens van der Post's novel of political intrigue in Southern Africa. James Stewart was expected to take the lead role of an adventurer who discovers a concentration camp for Communist agents; Hitchcock wanted Grace Kelly to play the love interest.

After a disappointing research trip to South Africa where he concluded that he would have difficulty filming, especially on a budget – and with confusion of the story's politics and the impracticality of casting Kelly, Hitchcock deferred the project and instead cast Stewart in The Man Who Knew Too Much (1956). Hitchcock travelled to Livingstone near Victoria Falls and was a guest of Harry Sossen, one of the prominent inhabitants of this pioneer town. Hitchcock and Sossen were photographed together at the newly opened Livingstone Airport and the event was recorded in the local papers. Sossen was also in communication with Laurens van der Post who gave him a signed copy of the book Flamingo Feather during a visit to the Falls (staying at the Victoria Falls Hotel). Sossen's daughter Marion is in possession of the book today and a number of letters between her father and van der Post.

=== No Bail for the Judge ===
No Bail for the Judge was to be an adaptation of a thriller novel of the same title by Henry Cecil about a London barrister who, with the assistance of a gentleman thief, has to defend her father, a High Court judge, when he is accused of murdering a prostitute. In a change of pace from his usual blonde actresses, Audrey Hepburn would have played the barrister, with Laurence Harvey as the thief, and John Williams as the Hepburn character's father. Some sources, including Writing with Hitchcock author Steven DeRosa say that Hitchcock's interest in the novel started in the summer of 1954 while filming To Catch a Thief (1955), and that Hitchcock hoped to have John Michael Hayes write the screenplay. Hepburn was an admirer of Hitchcock's work and had long wanted to appear in one of his films.

Samuel A. Taylor, scenarist for Vertigo (1958) and Topaz (1969), wrote the screenplay after Ernest Lehman rejected it. The Taylor screenplay included a scene, not in the original novel, where the heroine disguises herself as a prostitute and has to fend off a rapist. Hepburn left the film, partly because of the near-rape scene, but primarily due to a pregnancy. Hepburn suffered a miscarriage during filming of The Unforgiven (1960) and then gave birth to son Sean Ferrer that July. Laurence Harvey still ended up working with Hitchcock in 1959, however, on an episode that Hitchcock directed of Alfred Hitchcock Presents.

Without Hepburn, the project didn't have the same appeal for Hitchcock. Changes in British law concerning prostitution and entrapment — changes that took place after the novel was published — made some aspects of the screenplay implausible. Hitchcock told Paramount Pictures it was better to write off $200,000 already spent on the film's development than to spend another $3 million for a film he no longer cared for. In the fall of 1959, a Paramount publicity brochure titled "Success in the Sixties!" had touted No Bail for the Judge as an upcoming feature film starring Hepburn, to be filmed in Technicolor and VistaVision.

=== Our Man in Havana ===
Among the filmmakers vying for the rights to Graham Greene's latest novel Our Man in Havana was Hitchcock, who hoped to produce a film of the work. When Hitchcock refused to meet the asking price of £50,000, Greene sold the film rights to his friend Carol Reed for much less, figuring that he should at least sell them to someone he knew would remain faithful to the novel if he were to take less than he wanted.

=== The Wreck of the Mary Deare ===
The Hammond Innes novel was optioned by Metro-Goldwyn-Mayer with the intention of having Hitchcock direct the picture, starring Gary Cooper and Burt Lancaster. Hitchcock had long wanted to work with Cooper, who had been asked to star in Foreign Correspondent (1940), and Lancaster, who had been asked to star in Under Capricorn (1948). After developing the script with Ernest Lehman for several weeks, they concluded that it couldn't be done without turning the movie into "a boring courtroom drama."

Hitchcock and Lehman made an appearance before MGM executives telling the story of North by Northwest (1959), and said that MGM would get two films out of Hitchcock under his contract with MGM. However, Hitchcock eventually abandoned the idea of The Wreck of the Mary Deare (which MGM proceeded to make with Cooper and director Michael Anderson) and went ahead with North by Northwest instead.

== 1960s ==
=== The Blind Man ===
Following Psycho (1960), Hitchcock reunited with Ernest Lehman for an original screenplay idea: blind pianist Jimmy Shearing—to be played by James Stewart—regains his sight after receiving the eyes of a dead man. Watching a Wild West show at Disneyland with his family, Shearing would have visions of being shot and come to realize that the dead man was in fact murdered; with the image of the murderer still imprinted on the retina of his eyes. The film was to end with a chase around the RMS Queen Mary ocean liner. Walt Disney reputedly barred Hitchcock from shooting at Disneyland after seeing Psycho. Stewart left the project, Lehman argued with Hitchcock, and the script was never shot.

Lehman's unfinished script was later completed as a radio drama by Mark Gatiss and presented on BBC Radio 4 in 2015.

=== Village of Stars ===
Hitchcock bought the rights to the 1960 novel Village of Stars by David Beaty (written under the pen name Paul Stanton) after The Blind Man project was canceled. The book follows a Royal Air Force V bomber crew given an order to drop a nuclear bomb, only to have the order aborted. Unfortunately, the bomb is resisting attempts to defuse it and the plane can only stay in flight for a limited time.

=== Trap for a Solitary Man ===
Announced in September 1960, Trap for a Solitary Man was scheduled to be directed by Hitchcock in widescreen by Twentieth Century-Fox. The story, based on the 1960 play Piege Pour un Homme Seul by Robert Thomas, follows a young married couple on holiday in the Alps. The wife disappears, and after a prolonged search the police bring back someone they claim to be her, she even says she is the man's wife, but the man says he has never seen her before.

The play was later adapted three times as television films: Honeymoon with a Stranger (ABC, 1969), One of My Wives Is Missing (ABC, 1976) and Vanishing Act (CBS, 1986). A previous film, the 1958 Associated British-Pathé feature Chase a Crooked Shadow, has a similar plot and may have influenced the Thomas play.

=== We, the Accused ===
In a 1963 interview with Peter Bogdanovich, Hitchcock mentioned an unfilmed project of his—We, the Accused—which was based on the Dr. Crippen murder case. "It would be a very long picture, with detailed characterization, but I'm afraid it's terribly downbeat—and the man is middle-aged—so it wouldn't be very commercial. And you would have to spend some money on it."

=== Mary Rose ===
Hitchcock had long desired to turn J. M. Barrie's 1920 play Mary Rose into a film. After working together on Marnie (1964), Hitchcock asked Jay Presson Allen to adapt the play into a screenplay. Hitchcock would later tell interviewers that his contract with Universal Pictures allowed him to make any film, so long as the budget was under $3 million, and so long as it was not Mary Rose. Whether or not this was actually true, Lew Wasserman was not keen on the project, though Hitchcock never gave up hope of one day filming it.

=== The Three Hostages ===
In 1964, Hitchcock re-read another Richard Hannay novel by John Buchan, The Three Hostages, with a mind to adapting it. As with Greenmantle a quarter of a century earlier, the rights were elusive. But also the story was dated, very much rooted in the 1930s, and the plot involved a villain whose blind mother hypnotizes the hero. Hitchcock, in interviews, said that he felt that the portrayal of hypnosis did not work on film, and that films that attempted this portrayal, in Hitchcock's opinion, turned out poorly.

In 1977, the BBC aired an 85-minute adaptation of The Three Hostages starring Barry Foster, directed by Clive Donner.

=== Kaleidoscope ===
Although Hitchcock made a film called Frenzy (1972), plot points came from an idea Hitchcock had a few years earlier for a prequel to Shadow of a Doubt (1943). Hitchcock approached many writers including Samuel Taylor, Alec Coppel, and Psycho writer Robert Bloch, but in the end engaged an old friend, Benn Levy to flesh out his sketchy idea.

The story (inspired by English serial killers Neville Heath and John George Haigh) would have revolved around a young, handsome bodybuilder who lures young women to their deaths, a version of the character known as "Merry Widow Murderer" in Shadow of a Doubt. The New York police set a trap for him, with a policewoman posing as a potential victim. The script was based around three crescendos dictated by Hitchcock: the first was a murder by a waterfall; the second murder would take place on a mothballed warship; and the finale, which would take place at an oil refinery with brightly colored drums.

Hitchcock showed his script to his friend François Truffaut. Though Truffaut admired the script, he felt uneasy about its relentless sex and violence. Unlike Psycho, these elements would not be hidden behind the respectable veneer of murder mystery and psychological suspense, and the killer would be the main character, the hero, the eyes of the audience.

Universal vetoed the film, despite Hitchcock's assurances that he would make the film for under $1 million with a cast of unknowns, although David Hemmings, Robert Redford, and Michael Caine had all been suggested as leads. The film — alternatively known as Frenzy or the more sixties-esque Kaleidoscope — was not made.

Test footage from this project can be viewed here and is included in the 1999 TV documentaries Dial H For Hitchcock: The Genius Behind the Showman and Reputations: Alfred Hitchcock.

=== R.R.R.R. ===
Hitchcock approached Italian comedy-thriller writers Agenore Incrocci and Furio Scarpelli (Age & Scarpelli), writers of Big Deal on Madonna Street (1958), to write a screenplay around an original idea Hitchcock had carried in his head since the late 1930s. A New York City hotel is run by an Italian immigrant who is unaware that his family are using the hotel as cover for crimes, including the theft of a valuable coin from a guest of the hotel. (R.R.R.R. is the highest value of coin.)

The Italian screenwriters struggled with the story, and were not helped by the language barrier. Universal Pictures were not keen on the idea and persuaded Hitchcock to move on to something else.

=== Daddy's Gone A-Hunting ===
According to Larry Cohen, Hitchcock was interested in directing his script of Daddy's Gone A-Hunting (1969), but Universal Pictures "pressured him out of it because one of the key issues in the story was abortion". He expounded on his working relationship with Hitchcock:

every meeting or meal with Hitchcock would last three hours or more, because he loved to talk. He was full of ideas for shots and scenes. We talked about filming a movie inside a phone booth, but we could never figure out how to do it. Years later I figured it out, but he was already gone by that time. I certainly enjoyed the relationship, and frankly, it's probably for the best I didn't end becoming one of his writers, because he was extremely insensitive and cruel to the writers.

== 1970s ==
=== The Short Night ===
Hitchcock's last, unfinished project was The Short Night, an adaptation of the spy thriller of the same name by Ronald Kirkbride. A British double agent (loosely based on George Blake) escapes from prison and flees to Moscow via Finland, where his wife and children are waiting. An American agent – whose brother was one of the traitor's victims – heads to Finland to intercept him but ends up falling for the wife. It was Hitchcock's third attempt – after Torn Curtain (1966) and Topaz (1969) – to produce a "realistic Bond film." Clint Eastwood, and Sean Connery were possible male leads. Liv Ullmann was asked to play the double agent's wife. Catherine Deneuve was also asked to star. Walter Matthau was considered for the villain role. Ed Lauter was also discussed for a role as one of Matthau's prison mates.

The first writer assigned to the picture, James Costigan, quarreled with the director, who asked for him to be paid off. Then Ernest Lehman agreed to work on the script. Lehman felt the story should focus on the American spy, and left out the double agent's jailbreak. Lehman left the film too, and Hitchcock asked old friend Norman Lloyd to help him write a long treatment. Lloyd, like Universal, was concerned that Hitchcock's failing health meant that the movie might not get made. When Hitchcock suggested moving straight on to the screenplay, Lloyd objected, saying they were unprepared. Hitchcock reacted angrily, fired Lloyd, and worked on the treatment alone.

After a while, Hitchcock accepted that he needed another writer to work with him, and Universal suggested David Freeman. Freeman helped Hitchcock complete the treatment and wrote the screenplay. He wrote about his experiences in the 1999 book The Last Days of Alfred Hitchcock, which includes his completed screenplay. The circumstances surrounding Hitchcock's retirement were given by producer Hilton A. Green during the documentary Plotting "Family Plot". According to Green, during pre-production for The Short Night Hitchcock met Green to tell him that his poor health would prevent him from making the film that was to be the follow-up to Family Plot (1976). After trying to talk Hitchcock out of his decision, Green agreed to Hitchcock's request to bring the news of his decision to retire to studio head Lew Wasserman, a long-time friend of Hitchcock.

== See also ==
- Alfred Hitchcock filmography
