= List of cameo appearances by Alfred Hitchcock =

Alfred Hitchcock (left) in a cameo appearance from Blackmail (1929)

English film director Alfred Hitchcock made cameo appearances in 40 of his films. They began during production of The Lodger: A Story of the London Fog when an actor failed to show up, and the director filled in for him.

== History ==
The playful gesture became one of Hitchcock's trademarks, with fans making a sport of trying to spot his cameos. In his earliest appearances, he filled in as an obscure extra in crowds or walking through scenes in long camera shots. His later appearances became more prominent, such as when he turns to see Jane Wyman's disguise as she passes him in Stage Fright, and in stark silhouette in his final film Family Plot. As a recurring theme, he would carry a musical instrument, such as the double bass he wrestles onto a train at the beginning of Strangers on a Train. His longest cameos are in Blackmail and Young and Innocent.

In his discussion with François Truffaut, Hitchcock called the gag "troublesome" because audience anticipation of his appearance had grown distracting. To keep the focus on the film, the director would get his cameo over in the first five minutes.

Hitchcock's cameos often signify an important moment, such as when the protagonist travels to the location where their ordeal will ensue. The director also used his appearances to foreshadow or underscore the themes of the film. The other major function of the cameos is as a metafictional device, harking back to Elizabethan drama. In a kind of signature of authorship, Hitchcock is signaling to the audience that it is being manipulated by him.

== Cameo appearances in Hitchcock films ==
Title	Year	H:M[:S]	Description
The Birds	1963	0:02:18	Leaving the pet shop with two of his own Sealyham Terriers, Geoffrey and Stanley, as Tippi Hedren enters.
Blackmail	1929	0:10:25	Being bothered by a small boy as he reads a book on the London Underground. This cameo is 19 seconds long.
Dial M for Murder	1954	0:13:13	On the left side in the class-reunion photo sitting at the same table near Swan and Wendice.
Easy Virtue	1928	0:21:15	Walking past a tennis court carrying a walking stick.
Family Plot	1976	0:40:00	In silhouette through the door of the Registrar of Births and Deaths.
Foreign Correspondent	1940	0:12:44	After Joel McCrea leaves his hotel, he is seen wearing a coat and hat and reading a newspaper.
Frenzy	1972	0:02:24	At the very end of the aerial shot of the opening credits, wearing a bowler hat and leaning on the riverside wall at the bottom left of the concluding long shot. About a minute later, in the centre of a crowd, the only one not applauding the speaker; and another minute later, right after the victim washes ashore, standing next to a grey-haired bearded man.
I Confess	1953	0:01:33	Crossing the top of a flight of steps.
The Lady Vanishes	1938	1:32:31	In Victoria Station, wearing a black coat, smoking a cigarette, and making a strange movement with his head.
Lifeboat	1944	0:25:00	In the "before" and "after" pictures in the newspaper ad for "Reduco Obesity Slayer".
The Lodger	1927	0:04:44	Sitting with his back to the camera at a desk in the newsroom.
The Lodger	1927	1:23:50	In the mob scene next to Detective Joe, who is bearing the lodger's weight on the fence by holding his arms. (Disputed)
The Man Who Knew Too Much	1934	0:33:25	Walking across a road in a dark trench coat as a bus passes.
The Man Who Knew Too Much	1956	0:25:42	As the McKennas watch the acrobats in the marketplace, Hitchcock appears at the left in a suit and puts his hands in his pockets.
Marnie	1964	0:05:00	Entering from the left of the hotel corridor after Tippi Hedren passes by.
Mr. & Mrs. Smith	1941	0:42:57	Passing Robert Montgomery in front of his building.
Murder!	1930	0:59:45	Walking past the house where the murder was committed with a female companion, at the end of Sir John's visit to the scene with Markham and his wife Lucy.
North by Northwest	1959	0:02:09	Missing a bus, just after his credit passes off screen during the opening title sequence.
Notorious	1946	1:04:44	At the big party in Claude Rains's mansion, drinking champagne and then quickly departing as Cary Grant enters.
Number Seventeen	1932	0:51:25	On the bus amongst other passengers, in a dark coat and hat, facing away, he bounces up and down; approx. four seconds. (Disputed)
The Paradine Case	1947	0:38:00	Leaving the train at a railway station, carrying a cello case.
Psycho	1960	0:06:59	Seen through an office window wearing a Stetson cowboy hat as Janet Leigh comes through the door.
Rear Window	1954	0:26:12	Winding the clock at the fireplace in the songwriter's apartment.
Rebecca	1940	2:06:57	The man wearing a bowler and topcoat with upturned collar that walks right to left behind Favell, played by George Sanders, and the policeman after Favell calls Mrs. Danvers.
Rope	1948	0:01:51	Just after Hitchcock's credit towards the end of the opening sequence, walking alongside a woman.
Rope	1948	0:55:00	In the background as a red flashing neon sign of his trademark profile.
Sabotage	1936	0:08:56	Just after the lights come back on in front of the Bijou, looking up as he crosses in front of the crowd.
Saboteur	1942	1:04:45	Standing in front of "Cut Rate Drugs" as the saboteurs' car stops.
Shadow of a Doubt	1943	0:16:27	On the train to Santa Rosa, playing cards, his back to the camera; he has a full hand of spades.
Spellbound	1945	0:39:01	Coming out of an elevator at the Empire State Hotel, carrying a violin case and smoking a cigarette.
Stage Fright	1950	0:39:49	Turning to look back at Jane Wyman in her disguise as Marlene Dietrich's maid as she is rehearsing her cover.
Strangers on a Train	1951	0:02:22	On the cover of the book Farley Granger is reading.
Strangers on a Train	1951	0:10:34	Boarding a train with a double bass as Farley Granger gets off in his hometown.
Suspicion	1941	0:03:25	Walking a horse across the screen at the hunt meet.
Suspicion	1941	0:44:58	Mailing a letter at the village postbox (long shot).
The 39 Steps	1935	0:06:56	The man littering by tossing a white cigarette box while the bus pulls up for Robert Donat and Lucie Mannheim to leave the theatre.
To Catch a Thief	1955	0:09:40	Sitting next to Cary Grant on the bus.
Topaz	1969	0:33:36	Being pushed in a wheelchair at the airport by a nurse. Hitchcock gets up from the chair, shakes hands with a man, and walks off to the right.
Torn Curtain	1966	0:08:00	Sitting in the Hotel d'Angleterre lobby with a baby on his knee. The music playing at this point is an adaptation of Funeral March of a Marionette, the theme for Alfred Hitchcock Presents
The Trouble with Harry	1955	0:22:14	Seen outside of the window—the man walking past the parked limousine of an old man who is looking at paintings.
Under Capricorn	1949	0:02:11	In the town square during new governor's speech with his back to the camera, wearing a blue coat and brown top hat.
Under Capricorn	1949	0:12:17	One of three men on the steps of the Government House.
Vertigo	1958	0:11:22	In a grey suit walking across a street with a trumpet case.
The Wrong Man	1956	0:00:18	Seen in silhouette narrating the film's prologue. Donald Spoto's biography says that Hitchcock chose to make an explicit appearance in this film (rather than a cameo) to emphasize that, unlike his other movies, The Wrong Man was a true story about an actual person.
Young and Innocent	1937	0:15:00	Outside the courthouse main entrance as one of several reporters and journalists (he is holding a camera) as Robert Tisdall (Derrick De Marney) walks out.
The Ring	1927	0:02:58	The carnival worker operating the man-dipping / dunk tank attraction.

== See also ==
- List of cameo appearances by Peter Jackson
- List of cameo appearances by Stan Lee
