= Frederick Ahern =

American production manager

- Born: December 31, 1907; St. Joseph, Missouri, U.S.
- Died: September 28, 1982 (aged 74); Van Nuys, California, U.S.
- Occupation: Production manager

Frederick Ahern (December 31, 1907 – September 28, 1982) was an American production manager.

Ahern began his career stacking lumber at Pathe Studios. Over the next ten years, he worked his way up to assistant production manager at Trem Carr Productions, (later known as Monogram Pictures). Ahern first job was as a production manager in 1940, working for Sol Lesser on the films, Tarzan and Stage Door Canteen. He worked for five years with David Selznick. During his time working for Selznick, Ahern met Alfred Hitchcock. He worked for Hitchcock the next five years, mainly overseas, on the films, Under Capricorn, Stage Fright, and Rope. In 1950, Ahern returned to work for Sol Lesser as Associate Producer and Production Manager on another Tarzan picture; this one filmed in Africa.

After building his reputation as a location production manager, Ahern signed on as director of West Coast Operations for CBS Television film and live programs. While there, he helped produce the Amos and Andy film series. The majority of his work there involved the production of 27 ½ hours a week of live TV shows, most of which were dramas. In 1955, Ahern returned to work and an Associate Producer of films. He also ran his own commercial production company during this time. Starting in 1960, he became the production manager for Quinn Martin on The New Breed TV series. Ahern worked for QM Productions for most of the next 20 years as either Production Manager or Vice President in charge of Production on practically every hit QM series.

Ahern died on September 28, 1982 in Van Nuys, California, at the age of 74.
