= Transatlantic Pictures =

Film production company founded by Alfred Hitchcock

- Industry: Film
- Founded: 1945; 81 years ago
- Founder: Alfred Hitchcock; Sidney Bernstein
- Defunct: 1954; 72 years ago
- Successors: Shamley Productions
- Key people: Alfred Hitchcock; Sidney Bernstein
- Products: Films
- Owner: Independent (1945–1954)

Transatlantic Pictures was founded by Alfred Hitchcock and longtime associate Sidney Bernstein at the end of World War II in preparation for the end of Hitchcock's contract with David O. Selznick in 1947.

== Overview ==
In 1945, Hitchcock and Bernstein were involved with a planned 80-minute documentary on Nazi concentration camps which was eventually shown on television in the US and UK as Memory of the Camps (1985). They planned to produce feature films in both Hollywood and London.

The first two Transatlantic films, Hitchcock's Rope (1948) and Under Capricorn (1949), both released in the US by Warner Bros., had poor box office returns. Rope was banned in several US cities due to the themes of homosexuality, and Under Capricorn was overshadowed by Ingrid Bergman's extramarital affair with director Roberto Rossellini.

A third Hitchcock film, Stage Fright (1950) filmed on location in London, was a Transatlantic Pictures production, even though the copyrights are filed directly through WB (as part of Warner financing and distribution deal). This was also the case for Strangers on a Train (1951) and I Confess, both made through Transatlantic Pictures.

In early 1953, Hitchcock and Bernstein planned to film the 1948 David Duncan novel The Bramble Bush as a Transatlantic release. To Catch a Thief was also planned as a Transatlantic/Warner Bros. production in 1953, before the project was carried over to Paramount Pictures (where Hitchcock formed a new film production company, Alfred J. Hitchcock Productions).

However, script and budget problems during production prompted Hitchcock and Bernstein to dissolve the partnership, with Warners giving Hitchcock permission to go ahead with Dial M for Murder (1954) instead. Transatlantic was also the original company intended to produce the television program Alfred Hitchcock Presents, when first announced in 1954; Hitchcock subsequently formed another unit, Shamley Productions, to produce the show.

== Filmography ==
- Rope (1948)
- Under Capricorn (1949)
- Stage Fright (1950)
- Strangers on a Train (1951)
- I Confess (1953)

== See also ==
- List of unproduced Hitchcock projects
