= Mary Rose (play) =

Play by J. M. Barrie

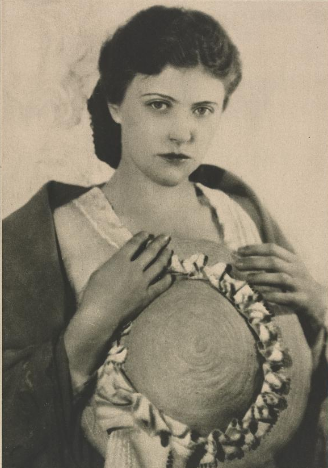
Ruth Chatterton in Charles Frohman's 1920 Broadway production of Mary Rose

Mary Rose is a play by J. M. Barrie, who is best known for Peter Pan. It was first produced in April 1920 at the Haymarket Theatre, London, with incidental music specially composed by Norman O'Neill. The play was produced in New York that year. Its most recent revival in New York was in 2007 and in London in 2012.

== Plot ==
This is the fictional story of Mary Rose, a girl who vanishes twice. As a child, Mary Rose was taken by her father to a remote Scottish island. While she is briefly out of her father's sight, Mary Rose vanishes. The entire island is searched exhaustively. Twenty-one days later, Mary Rose reappears as mysteriously as she disappeared ... but she shows no effects of having been gone for three weeks, and she has no knowledge of any gap or missing time.

Years later, as a young wife and mother, the adult Mary Rose persuades her husband to take her to the same island. Again she vanishes: this time for a period of decades. When she is found again, she is not a single day older and has no awareness of the passage of time. In the interim, her son has grown to adulthood and is now physically older than his mother.

== Productions ==
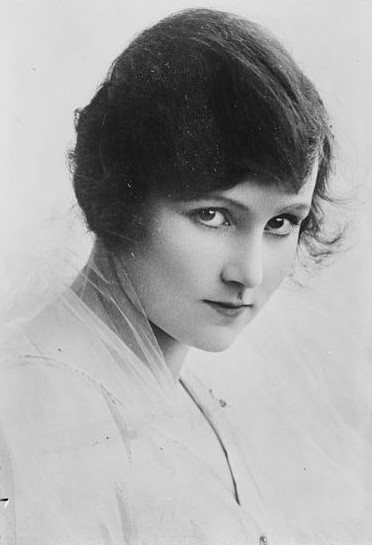
Fay Compton, for whom the title role of Mary Rose was written

Barrie, who normally wrote with his right hand, wrote Mary Rose with his left hand due to a "writer's cramp". Mary Rose first opened in London at the Haymarket Theatre, running from 22 April 1920 to 26 February 1921, with Fay Compton as Mary Rose, a role which was written for her by Barrie. It was revived (with many of the same cast still in place) in 1926.

Mary Rose opened in New York on Broadway at the Empire Theatre, running from 22 December 1920 to April 1921. The Charles Frohman production was directed by Ben Iden Payne, with Ruth Chatterton as Mary Rose.

A revival ran on Broadway at the ANTA Playhouse, running from 4 March 1951 to 16 March 1951. The play was directed by John Stix, produced by Helen Hayes, with Mary Rose played by Bethel Leslie.

The play was produced by the Lyceum Theatre Company in Edinburgh in 1988, under the direction of Hugh Hodgart.

The play was revived off-Broadway by the Vineyard Theater in 2007. The play was produced in a London revival in 2012 at Riverside Studios. A further production appeared in the 2017 summer season at Pitlochry Festival Theatre.

== Music ==
Norman O'Neill's original music for the 1920 production gained widespread acclaim. At the end of the first night, Barrie greeted the composer with "Well, O'Neill, I think we have made a success", and later wrote him a letter that "it was a lucky day for me when you had that inspiration." Barrie also described the effect of the music in the stage directions of the published text, effectively incorporating the music into the play. Fay Compton wrote of "that beautiful, haunting music which in turn inspired us; the tremendous debt of gratitude I owed to that music I can never hope to repay." Ernest Irving compared a performance of Mary Rose without O'Neill's music to "a dance by a fairy with a wooden leg."

== Reception ==
In 1921, the play was included in Best Plays of 1920–1921.

The New York Times reviewer called the 2007 revival of the play an "elegantly plotted ghost story". He noted: "The play is in many ways a more mature and mournful reworking of themes Barrie explored in the tale of the boy Peter Pan who refused to grow up. Time is seen as a quiet despoiler of happiness and innocence, and the lure of another world unblemished by its passing has an irresistible seduction."

Of its London revival in 2012, a reviewer wrote that the play "...reveals a somewhat uncomfortable preoccupation with childhood innocence extending some of the themes of [Peter] Pan; the child who cannot grow up, and meditation on death and loss."

== Adaptations ==
Alfred Hitchcock had seen the play as a young man in its original production. Later in his career as a film director, he wanted to film it, asking Jay Presson Allen to write a screenplay after she had written the screenplay for Hitchcock's film Marnie (1964). However, Hitchcock was under contract to Universal Pictures at the time, and the studio believed that the project was "too troubling", with not enough commercial appeal, so would not approve production.

In 2016, a radio play adaptation of Mary Rose was broadcast on BBC Radio 3. It was adapted and directed by Abigail le Fleming with music composed and performed by cellist Laura Moody.

In 2017, Adaptive Books published the novel Mary Rose by Geoffrey Girard, a modern retelling based on the original play and Hitchcock's plans. Booklist gave the novel a starred review, calling the adaptation "a ghost story that should be suggested to a wide range of readers."

In 2022, a musical adaptation of Mary Rose opened in Chicago, with book and lyrics by Ed Rutherford and music and lyrics by Jeff Bouthiette, produced by Black Button Eyes Productions.

A 2024 film titled The Island Between Tides starring Paloma Kwiatkowski, Donal Logue, David Mazouz, Camille Sullivan and Adam Beach was filmed in Prince Rupert, Canada.

== See also ==
- The published 1925 text of Barrie's Mary Rose on archive.org
- Mary Rose public domain audiobook at LibriVox
- List of unproduced Hitchcock projects
