= Dial M for Murder =

1954 American film by Alfred Hitchcock

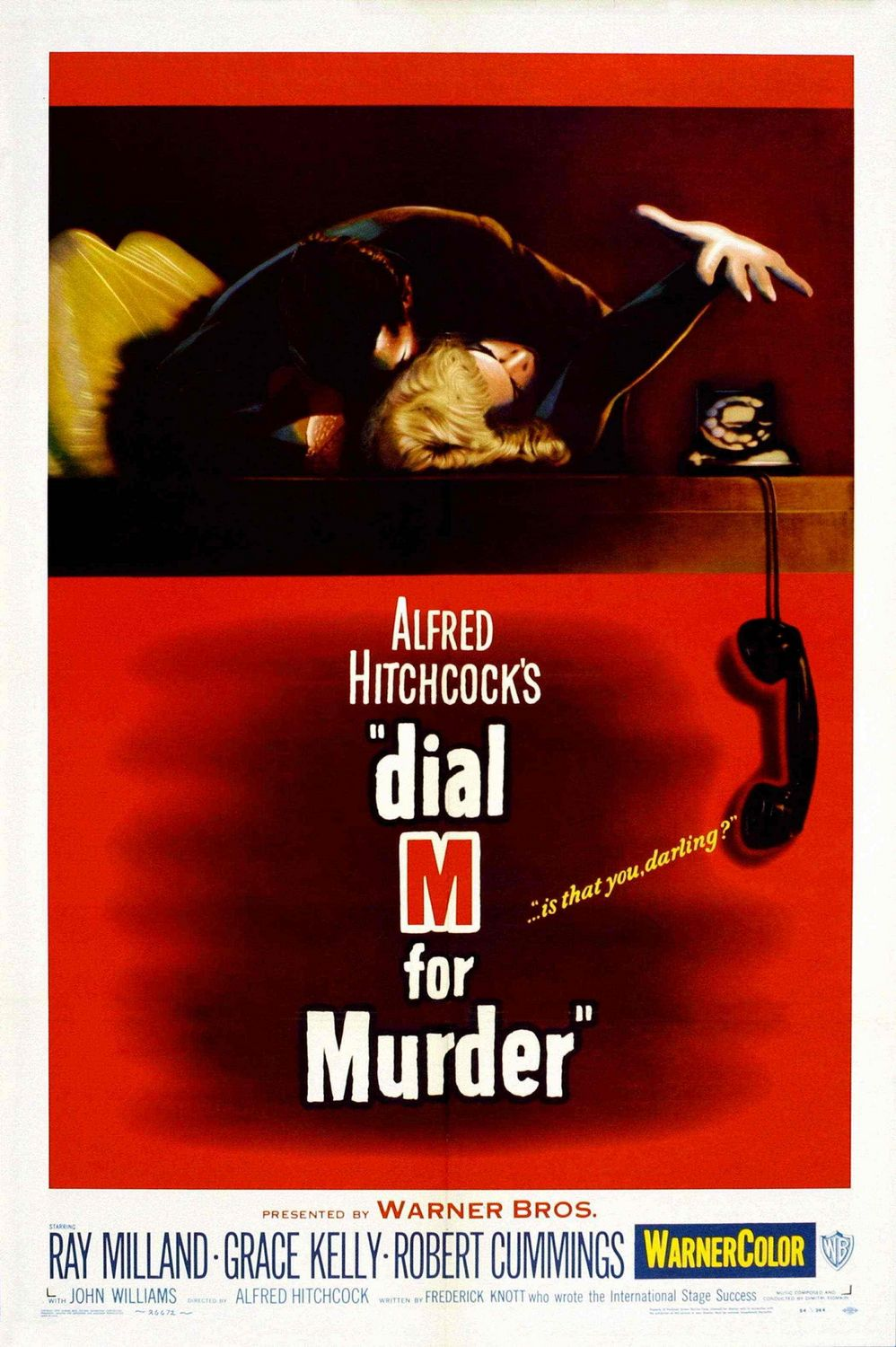
- Theatrical release poster by Bill Gold
- Directed by: Alfred Hitchcock
- Screenplay by: Frederick Knott
- Based on: Dial M for Murder; 1952 play by Frederick Knott
- Produced by: Alfred Hitchcock
- Starring: Ray Milland; Grace Kelly; Robert Cummings; John Williams
- Cinematography: Robert Burks
- Edited by: Rudi Fehr
- Music by: Dimitri Tiomkin
- Production company: Warner Bros.
- Distributed by: Warner Bros.
- Release dates: May 18, 1954 (Philadelphia); May 29, 1954 (United States)
- Running time: 105 minutes
- Country: United States
- Language: English
- Budget: $1.4 million
- Box office: $6.1 million

Dial M for Murder is a 1954 American crime thriller film directed by Alfred Hitchcock, starring Ray Milland, Grace Kelly, Robert Cummings, Anthony Dawson, and John Williams. Both the screenplay and the successful stage play on which it was based were written by English playwright Frederick Knott. The play premiered in 1952 on BBC Television, before being performed on stage in the same year in London's West End in June, and then New York City's Broadway in October.

Originally intended to be shown in dual-strip polarized three dimensions (3-D), the film played in most cinemas in ordinary two dimensions (2-D) owing to the loss of interest in the 3-D process (the projection of which was difficult and error-prone) by the time of its release. The film earned an estimated $2.7 million in North American box-office sales in 1954.

== Plot ==
Cummings, Kelly, and Milland

Tony Wendice, a retired English professional tennis player, is married to wealthy socialite Margot, who has been having an affair with Mark Halliday, an American crime-fiction writer. Tony secretly knows about the affair and plots Margot's murder to inherit her fortune, fearing a divorce would leave him penniless.

Charles Swann, formerly Tony's Cambridge University classmate, has a criminal record that Tony is well aware of. Tony invites Swann to his Maida Vale flat on a pretext, and confides Margot's affair. He reveals that six months earlier he had stolen Margot's handbag, containing a love letter from Mark, and had anonymously blackmailed her. Tricking Swann into leaving fingerprints on the letter, Tony threatens to expose him as the blackmailer unless he agrees to kill Margot.

With the added inducement of £1,000 in cash, Swann agrees to the murder Tony has plotted. Tony and Mark are to attend a party, while Margot stays home alone. At an agreed time, when Margot is in bed, Swann is to enter the building and open the flat's front door with Margot's latchkey, which Tony will have hidden on the hall staircase under the carpet. When Tony telephones from the party, Swann is to kill Margot as she answers the call. He is then to stage a burglary-gone-wrong, and put the key back under the staircase carpet as he leaves.

The following night, Swann enters the flat, and Tony rings as planned. When Swann tries to strangle Margot with his scarf, she grabs a pair of scissors and fatally stabs him. Hearing Margot plead for help, Tony advises her not to speak to anyone. He returns home, calls the police, sends Margot to bed and, taking what he thinks is Margot's key from Swann's pocket, returns it to her handbag. To frame Margot, he plants Mark's letter on Swann and burns his scarf.

Chief Inspector Hubbard questions the Wendices, and Margot makes conflicting statements. When Hubbard surmises that Swann entered through the flat's front door, Tony suggests that Swann must have stolen Margot's handbag and copied her key. As Tony intends, Hubbard is not convinced, and arrests Margot on suspicion of killing her blackmailer. At her trial, Margot is found guilty of murder and is sentenced to death.

On the day before Margot's scheduled execution, Mark tells Tony that he has concocted "a story" in a final effort to save Margot; one that is very close to reality. He suggests that Tony should tell the police that he paid Swann to kill Margot. If Tony confesses to that, Mark suggests, he would go to prison for a while but Margot's life would be spared. Their discussion is interrupted by Hubbard arriving unexpectedly, and Mark hides in the bedroom. Hubbard asks Tony about large sums of cash he has been spending around town, and enquires about his attaché case. Mark, listening from the bedroom, realises it is on the bed, full of banknotes. Deducing that the money was intended for Tony's payoff to Swann, Mark emerges with the case. Throwing suspicion back onto Margot, Tony "confesses" that in order to protect his wife he concealed the cash she was intending to pay to her blackmailer. Hubbard appears to accept Tony's explanation and, after covertly swapping his own raincoat for Tony's, which has his latch key in the pocket, Hubbard leaves, as do Mark and Tony.

Hubbard uses Tony's key to re-enter the empty flat, followed by Mark. Having previously discovered that the key in Margot's handbag was Swann's own latchkey, Hubbard deduces that Swann had put Margot's key back in its hiding place immediately after unlocking the door, instead of upon leaving. Suspecting Tony, Hubbard sets a trap.

Plainclothes police bring Margot from prison to the flat. She tries unsuccessfully to unlock the door with the key in her handbag; her ignorance of the hidden key still under the carpet outside proves her innocence. Margot's handbag is returned to the police station, where Tony retrieves it after discovering his key is missing. When the key from Margot's bag does not work, he remembers the hidden key, thus demonstrating his guilt. With all escape routes blocked, Tony calmly makes himself a drink and congratulates Hubbard.

== Cast ==
- Ray Milland as Tony Wendice
- Grace Kelly as Margot Mary Wendice
- Robert Cummings as Mark Halliday
- John Williams as Chief Inspector Hubbard
- Anthony Dawson as Charles Alexander Swann/Captain Lesgate
- Leo Britt as storyteller at the party
- Patrick Allen as Detective Pearson
- George Leigh as Detective Williams
- George Alderson as First Detective
- Robin Hughes as Police Sergeant
- Martin Milner as policeman outside Wendice flat (uncredited)

== Production ==
After I Confess (1953), Hitchcock planned to film The Bramble Bush, based on the 1948 novel by David Duncan, as a Transatlantic Pictures production, with partner Sidney Bernstein. However, the script and budget were problematic, and Hitchcock and Bernstein decided to dissolve their partnership. Warner Bros. Pictures allowed Hitchcock to scrap the film and begin production on Dial M for Murder.

According to his biographer, Donald Spoto, Hitchcock was not enthusiastic about the film, and Spoto quotes Grace Kelly to the effect that "the only reason [Hitchcock] could remain calm was that he was already preparing his next picture, Rear Window".

Mark's name was changed for the film; in the original play, he was Max Halliday. Actors Dawson and Williams reprise their Broadway roles as Swann/Captain Lesgate and Inspector Hubbard, respectively.

Cummings had previously made Saboteur for Hitchcock.

Alfred Hitchcock's cameo is a signature occurrence in most of his films. In Dial M for Murder, he can be seen thirteen minutes into the film, in a black-and-white reunion photograph, sitting at a banquet table among former students and faculty.

== Release ==
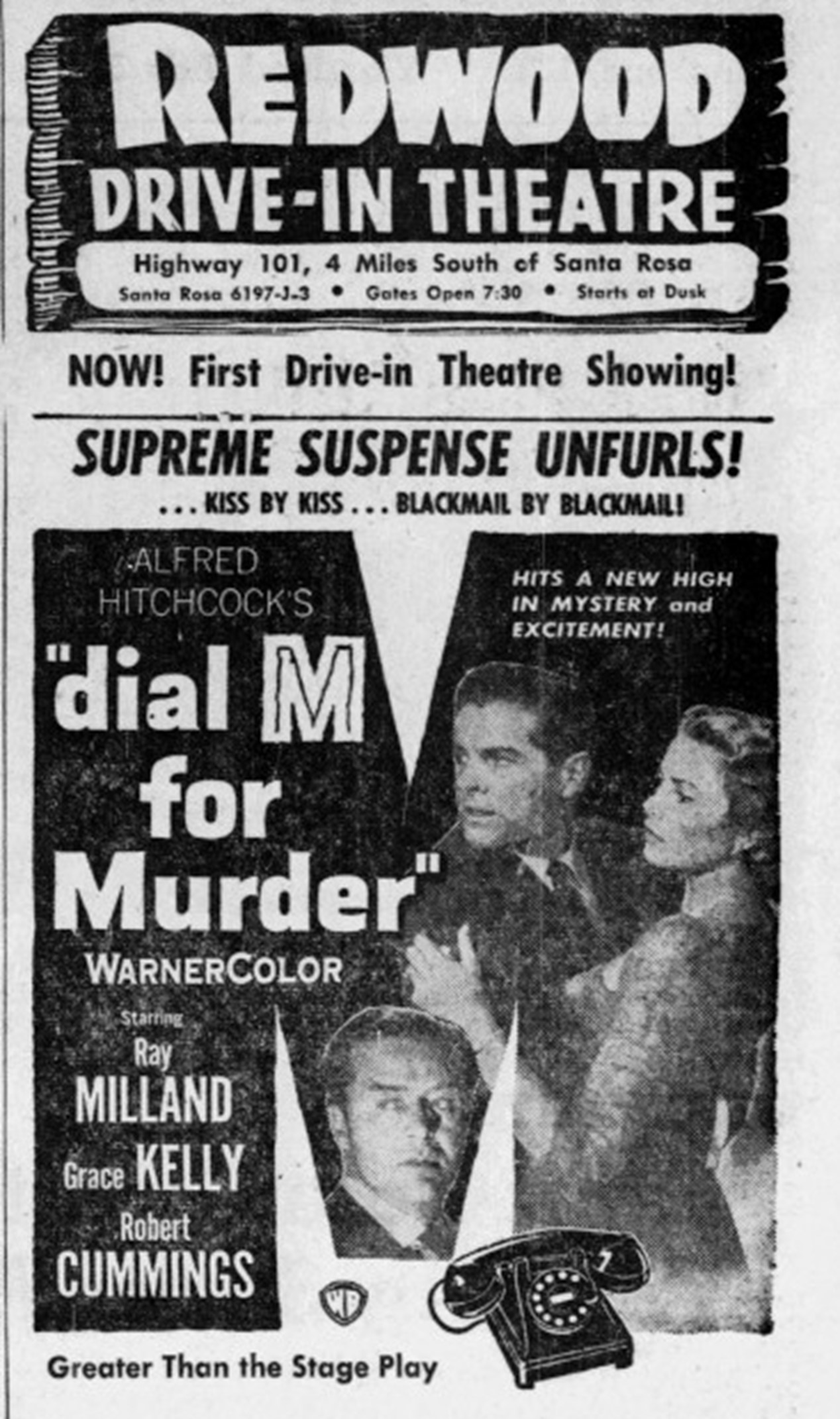
Drive-in advertisement from 1954.

Dial M for Murder was shot using Warner Bros.' own proprietary 3-D camera rig, the so-called All-Media Camera. After one preview performance on May 18 and four showings on May 19, a Philadelphia theater manager frantically contacted the studio and said that people were staying away in droves. He asked for permission to drop the 3-D and show the film flat.

The Philadelphia Inquirer reported on May 23 that the "first audiences proved to be a jury that could not only make up its mind, but could make it up in a hurry. In exhibitors' own terms, 'DIAL M' literally died. And after just four performances on Wednesday, some long-distance telephoning to report complaints, the increasing skimpiness of customers—a good many of them making no bones of their dissatisfaction—permission was given to throw away the glasses and hastily switch to the 2-D version. Whereupon business at the Randolph took a turn for the better."

Dial M for Murder marked the end of the brief flirtation with 3-D films of the early 1950s. Hitchcock said of 3-D: "It's a nine-day wonder, and I came in on the ninth day."

The dual-strip system was used for the February 1980 revival of the film in 3-D at the York Theater in San Francisco, California. This revival performed so well that Warner Bros. did a limited national re-release of the film in February 1982 using Chris Condon's single-strip StereoVision 3-D system. The re-release included a sold-out engagement at the Detroit Institute of Arts.

The film was shown in 3-D in some UK cinemas during the summer of 2013 and in Italy at the beginning of fall of the same year.

Warner Bros. released Dial M for Murder as a 3-D Blu-ray on October 9, 2012.

== Reception ==
Bosley Crowther of The New York Times described the film as a "technical triumph" for Hitchcock, in a favourable review. "It is one for which he needed good actors. He has them—and the best of the lot is John Williams, late of the stage play, who is the detective who solves the sinister ruse." Variety wrote: "There are a number of basic weaknesses in the set-up that keep the picture from being a good suspense show for any but the most gullible. Via the performances and several suspense tricks expected of Hitchcock, the weaknesses are glossed over to some extent, but not enough to rate the film a cinch winner." Harrison's Reports wrote that the film "shapes up as no more than a mild entertainment, despite the expert direction of Hitchcock and the competent acting of the players. The chief weakness is that the action is slow, caused by the fact that the story unfolds almost entirely by dialogue."

Richard L. Coe of The Washington Post called the film "completely choice", with Williams and Dawson "smooth as silk in reprising their stage roles", adding, "Hitch has a field day with his camera angles, darting our eyes now here, now there, doing tingling tricks with shadows and long longshots in quick contrast to fuzzed close-ups. It's the work of a master enjoying his script." John McCarten of The New Yorker wrote a generally positive review, writing that he wished the script would have given Hitchcock "a chance to cut loose with one of those spectacular chases he used to specialize in", but finding that after a talky opening 30 minutes, "things speed up once the murder wheels are set in motion, and eventually the piece becomes grimly diverting". The Monthly Film Bulletin wrote that the film "offers the prolific Hitchcock little more than an opportunity to carpenter a neat piece of filmed theatre—an opportunity which perhaps satisfied the master a little more than it does us ... The characters are fitted to their situations, and hardly exist in themselves (nor are they enlivened by the rather drab performances of Ray Milland, Grace Kelly, and Robert Cummings); only John Williams' dry, sardonic police inspector has a touch of individuality."

On the review aggregator website Rotten Tomatoes, 90% of 50 critics' reviews are positive, with an average rating of 7.40/10. The website's consensus reads: "Dial M for Murder may be slightly off-peak Hitchcock, but by any other standard, it's a sophisticated, chillingly sinister thriller -- and one that boasts an unforgettable performance from Grace Kelly to boot." Metacritic, which uses a weighted average, assigned the film a score of 75 out of 100, based on 11 critics, indicating "generally favorable" reviews. In 2012, The Guardian called the film "a taut, acidly funny thriller".

The film was listed by American Film Institute in 2001 in AFI's 100 Years...100 Thrills (number 48), and in 2008 in AFI's 10 Top 10 (number 9 in mysteries).

== Adaptations and references ==
=== Stage ===
As it is considered one of the classic examples of a stage thriller, Dial M for Murder has been adapted a number of times. The New Vic Theatre staged a production of the play in its main house (in the round) in 2017. It was directed by Peter Leslie Wild, and the cast featured William Ellis as Tony. The play received positive press reviews.

In 2022, another stage adaptation of Dial M for Murder written by Jeffrey Hatcher and approved by the Knott estate opened at the Old Globe Theater in San Diego, California. Hatcher kept the original setting of 1950s London, but changed the character of "Max Halliday" to "Maxine Hadley," making the love affair with Margot a lesbian one. That and other changes garnered critical praise. The adaptation has enjoyed many productions since its premiere.

=== Film ===
The film partially inspired a Hindi-language version in 1985, released as Aitbaar, starring Raj Babbar, Dimple Kapadia, and Suresh Oberoi. A Tamil-language adaptation, titled Saavi, with Sathyaraj, Saritha, Jaishankar, and Nizhalgal Ravi, was released in the same year. The film also inspired a Malayalam-language adaptation as New Year starring Jayaram, Urvashi, and Suresh Gopi in 1989.

A Perfect Murder is a 1998 remake directed by Andrew Davis in which the characters of Halliday and Swann are combined, with the husband (Michael Douglas) both hiring and coercing his wife's lover (played by Viggo Mortensen) into committing a contract killing of her (Gwyneth Paltrow).

The 2002 Bollywood film Humraaz starring Bobby Deol, Akshaye Khanna, and Amisha Patel, was in turn inspired by A Perfect Murder.

The 2001 Pakistani film Khoey Ho Tum Kahan is based on the film.

=== Television ===
The television series Alfred Hitchcock Presents premiered in the United States the year after Dial M for Murder was released. The main character in an episode from the series's first season, "Portrait of Jocelyn", is named Mark Halliday. In the episode, Halliday's wife, Jocelyn, has disappeared several years earlier, and the conclusion revealed that he murdered her.

In 1956, NBC aired a television film in which Maurice Evans (as Tony), Williams, and Dawson all repeated their roles from the original Broadway play. ABC produced a two-hour color version in 1967 featuring Laurence Harvey as Tony, Diane Cilento as Margot, and Hugh O'Brian as Max.

The episode "The Fifth Stair" of the TV series 77 Sunset Strip recreated Dial M for Murder, with Richard Long portraying Tony Wendice.

A US TV film with Angie Dickinson and Christopher Plummer aired in 1981. Tony Wendice's Mistake (Ошибка Тони Вендиса), based on the stage play version of Dial M for Murder, aired in on TV in the Soviet Union in 1981.

The third episode of the sixth season of Frasier is titled "Dial M for Martin". The plot centers on the title character's father believing that his younger son is subconsciously trying to kill him when he is beset by a series of mishaps seemingly caused by Frasier's younger brother, Niles.

The season-one finale of the TV series Archer is titled "Dial M for Mother" in reference to the film. In the episode, Sterling Archer is given a brain implant, which makes him subconsciously want to kill his mother Malory.

== See also ==
- List of films featuring home invasions
