= Under Capricorn =

1949 film by Alfred Hitchcock

- Australian theatrical poster
- Directed by: Alfred Hitchcock
- Screenplay by: James Bridie
- Adaptation by: Hume Cronyn
- Based on: Under Capricorn by Helen Simpson Under Capricorn by John Colton and Margaret Linden
- Produced by: Alfred Hitchcock; Sidney Bernstein
- Starring: Michael Wilding; Ingrid Bergman; Joseph Cotten; Margaret Leighton
- Narrated by: Edmond O'Brien
- Cinematography: Jack Cardiff
- Edited by: Bert Bates
- Music by: Richard Addinsell; Louis Levy
- Production company: Transatlantic Pictures
- Distributed by: Warner Bros. Pictures
- Release date: 8 September 1949
- Running time: 117 minutes
- Country: United Kingdom
- Language: English
- Budget: $3 million, $275,000 or $2,500,000
- Box office: $1.5 million or $2,668,000

Under Capricorn is a 1949 British historical drama film directed by Alfred Hitchcock about a couple in Australia who started out as lady and stable boy in Ireland, and who are now bound together by a horrible secret. The film is based on the play by John Colton and Margaret Linden, which in turn is based on the novel Under Capricorn (1937) by Helen Simpson. The screenplay was written by James Bridie from an adaptation by Hume Cronyn. This was Hitchcock's second film in Technicolor, and like his preceding colour film Rope (1948), it features 9- and 10-minute long takes.

The film is set in colonial Sydney, New South Wales, Australia, during the early 19th century. Under Capricorn is one of several Hitchcock films that are not typical thrillers: instead it is a murder mystery involving a love triangle, a previous killing, a "wrong man" scenario, a sinister housekeeper, class conflict, and very high levels of emotional tension, both on the surface and underneath.

The title Under Capricorn refers to the Tropic of Capricorn, named after a constellation which bisects Australia, Capricornus, the source also of the astrological sign associated with the goat, Capricorn.

== Plot ==
In 1831, Sydney is a frontier town, full of rough ex-convicts from the British Isles. The new Governor, Sir Richard, arrives with his charming and cheery but indolent second cousin, the Honourable Charles Adare.

Charles, who is hoping to make his fortune, is befriended by gruff Samson Flusky, a prosperous businessman who was previously a transported convict, apparently a murderer. Sam says that, because he has bought the legal limit of land, he wants Charles to buy land and sell it to him to get around that constraint. Though the Governor orders him not to go, Charles is invited to dinner at Sam's house.

Charles discovers that he already knows Sam's wife, Lady Henrietta, an aristocrat who was a good friend of Charles's sister when they were all children in Ireland. Lady Henrietta is now an alcoholic who is socially shunned.

Sam invites Charles to stay at his house, hoping it will cheer up his wife, who is on the verge of madness. The housekeeper, Milly, has completely taken over running the household, and is the one who secretly supplies Lady Henrietta with alcohol, hoping to destroy her and win Sam's affections.

Gradually, Charles restores Henrietta's self-confidence. They become closer and closer, and eventually they share a passionate kiss. But Henrietta explains that she and Sam are bound together most profoundly: when she was young, Sam was the handsome stable boy. Overcome with desire, they ran away and married at Gretna Green.

Henrietta's brother, furious that aristocratic Henrietta had paired up with a lowly servant, confronted them. Her brother shot at them and missed; she then shot her brother fatally. Sam made a false confession to save her and was sent to the penal colony in Australia. She followed him and waited seven years in abject poverty for his release.

After listening to Milly's greatly exaggerated stories of what Charles did in Lady Henrietta's bedroom, Sam becomes furious and orders Charles to leave. Taking Sam's favourite mare in the dark, Charles has a fall and the horse breaks a leg. Sam has to shoot her dead and, in a subsequent struggle over the gun, seriously wounds Charles. At the hospital, Henrietta confesses to the Governor that Sam was wrongly accused of the first crime of murder; she was the one who shot and killed her brother. By law she should be deported back to Ireland to stand trial.

Milly, still plying Henrietta with drink, is using a real shrunken head to fake hallucinations. Milly then attempts to kill Henrietta with an overdose of sedatives. She is caught in the act, and ordered out in disgrace.

The Governor, Sir Richard, has Sam arrested and charged with the attempted murder of Charles. Sir Richard ignores Henrietta's claim that Sam is innocent of both crimes. However, Charles decides to bend the truth; he says, on his word as a gentleman, that there was no confrontation, and no struggle over the gun. It was all an accident.

Sam and Henrietta are later seen together smiling at the dock, seeing Charles off for Ireland. They bid him a fond farewell.

== Cast ==
- Ingrid Bergman as Lady Henrietta Flusky
- Joseph Cotten as Samson "Sam" Flusky
- Michael Wilding as Honourable Charles Adare
- Margaret Leighton as Milly, Flusky's housekeeper
- Cecil Parker as the new Governor of New South Wales, Sir Richard
- Denis O'Dea as Mr Corrigan, Attorney General
- Jack Watling as Winter, Flusky's paroled butler
- Harcourt Williams as the Coachman
- John Ruddock as Mr Cedric Potter, bank manager
- Bill Shine as Mr Banks
- Victor Lucas as the Rev Smiley
- Ronald Adam as Mr Riggs
- Francis de Wolff as Major Wilkins
- G. H. Mulcaster as Dr Macallister
- Olive Sloane as Sal
- Maureen Delany as Flo
- Julia Lang as Susan
- Betty McDermott as Martha

== Production ==
The film was co-produced by Hitchcock and Sidney Bernstein for their short-lived production company, Transatlantic Pictures, and released through Warner Bros. Pictures.

The film was Hitchcock's second film in Technicolor, and uses long, near ten-minute takes similar to those in Hitchcock's previous film Rope (1948).

=== The long take ===
In Style and Meaning: Studies in the Detailed Analysis of Film, Ed Gallafent, professor of film at University of Warwick, writes:

The use of the long take in Under Capricorn relates to three elements of film's meaning.

1. Ideas of accessible and inaccessible space as expressed in the gothic house.
2. The form in which characters inhabit their past
3. The divergence or convergence of eyelines – the gaze that cannot, or must meet another’s.

All of these three elements can be linked to concepts of Guilt and Shame. In 1 and 2, the question is how something is felt to be present. In 3, it is difference between representation or sharing, of the past as flashback, and of the past as spoken narrative, where part of what is being articulated is precisely the inaccessibility of the past, its experience being locked inside the speaker. As for 3, the avoided gaze is determining physical sign of shame.

Gallafent also explains these aspects of Under Capricorn:

The inscription on the Flusky's mansion – Minyago Yugilla – means "Why weepest thou?"

St. Mary Magdalene (the patron saint of penitent sinners) in religious iconography: the bare feet, skull, the flail, the looking glass in which the beholder’s face is not always reflected, the jewels cast down to floor. All of these images are in the film. Sources for the imagery that Hitchcock might have had in mind are the paintings St. Mary Magdalene With a Candle (1630–1635) and St. Mary Magdalene With a Mirror (1635–1645), both by Georges de La Tour.

=== Production credits ===
The production credits on the film were as follows:

- Director – Alfred Hitchcock
- Writing – James Bridie (screenplay), Hume Cronyn (adaptation)
- Cinematography – Jack Cardiff (director of photography)
- Art direction – Thomas N. Morahan (production design); Philip Stockford (set dresser)
- Technicolor color director – Natalie Kalmus
- Costume design – Roger K. Furse
- Assistant director – C. Foster Kemp
- Production management – Fred Ahern (production manager), John Palmer (unit manager)
- Editor – A. S. Bates
- Operators of camera movement – Paul Beeson, Ian Craig, David McNeilly, Jack Haste
- Sound – Peter Handford (sound recordist)
- Continuity – Peggy Singer
- Makeup artist – Charles Parker
- Music – Richard Addinsell (musical score), Louis Levy (musical director)

== Background ==
- Playwright James Bridie, who wrote the screenplay for Under Capricorn, is famous for his Biblical plays, such as his Jonah and the Whale.
- Cecil Parker's character Sir Richard may be a representation of General Sir Richard Bourke, who was Governor of New South Wales from 1831 to 1837.
- Alfred Hitchcock's signature cameo occurs at the beginning of the film, with the director appearing in the town square during a parade wearing a blue coat and brown hat. He is also one of three men seen on the steps of the Government House 10 minutes later.
- In Truffaut/Hitchcock, Hitchcock told François Truffaut that Under Capricorn was such a failure that Bankers Trust Company of New York, which had financed the film, repossessed it, which then was unavailable until the first US network television screening in 1968. In the Truffaut interview, Hitchcock also mentioned a New York Times reviewer who wrote that he had to wait almost 100 minutes for the first suspenseful moment.

== Reception ==
=== Box-office ===
According to Warners' records, the film earned $1.21 million domestically and $1.46 million in foreign territories.

It is thought that the audience had imagined Under Capricorn was going to be a thriller, which it was not – the plot was a domestic love triangle with a few thriller elements thrown in – and this ultimately led to its box-office failure. However, the public reception of the film may have been damaged by the revelation in 1949 of the married Bergman's adulterous relationship with, and subsequent pregnancy by, the married Italian film director Roberto Rossellini.

=== Critical response ===
The film was not well received by critics.

Bosley Crowther of The New York Times wrote that "it seems that neither Miss Bergman nor Mr Hitchcock has tangled here with stuff of any better than penny-dreadful substance and superficial demands."

Variety called it "overlong and talky, with scant measure of the Hitchcock thriller tricks that could have sharpened general reception."

John McCarten of The New Yorker wrote that "this picture simultaneously succeeds in insulting the Australians, the Irish, and the average intelligence."

Richard L. Coe of The Washington Post wrote: "The triangle performances are splendid, but the lines and situations the three principals are called upon to face are trite indeed ... Jame's Bridie's script, from a Helen Simpson novel adapted by Hume Cronyn, has little to be proud of, is indeed unintentionally hilarious at times."

The Monthly Film Bulletin was also negative, writing: "The story is not enlivened by any qualities in the dialogue, which is crude and frequently stilted, or in the direction, which surely represents the nadir of Hitchcock's present period. It is extraordinary that this director, responsible for some of the most brilliant British films of the thirties—lively, fast, and full of incident—should return to this country from Hollywood for the sake of a ponderous novelette, which even more than Rope shows a preoccupation with complicated camera movements of no dramatic value whatsoever."

Harrison's Reports printed a mostly positive review, praising Bergman for "another striking performance" and adding, "The story is not without its weak points, particularly in that much of the footage is given more to talk than to movement, but Alfred Hitchcock's directorial skill manages to overcome most of the script's deficiencies by building up situations that thrill and hold the spectator in tense suspense." Edwin Schallert of the Los Angeles Times was also positive, calling it "a film of great class. It may fall short of Hitchcock's greatest in some respects because it lacks their vital suspense and intense interest. Yet its values are so noteworthy that it may definitely be recommended to all film-viewers."

In Peter Bogdanovich's interview with Alfred Hitchcock, Bogdanovich mentions that French critics writing for Cahiers du cinéma in the 1950s considered Under Capricorn one of Hitchcock's finest films.

== Mini-series ==
The novel was filmed as an Australian mini-series.

== See also ==
- 1949 in film
- British films of 1949
- List of drama films
- List of films set in Australia
