= I Confess (film) =

1953 film by Alfred Hitchcock

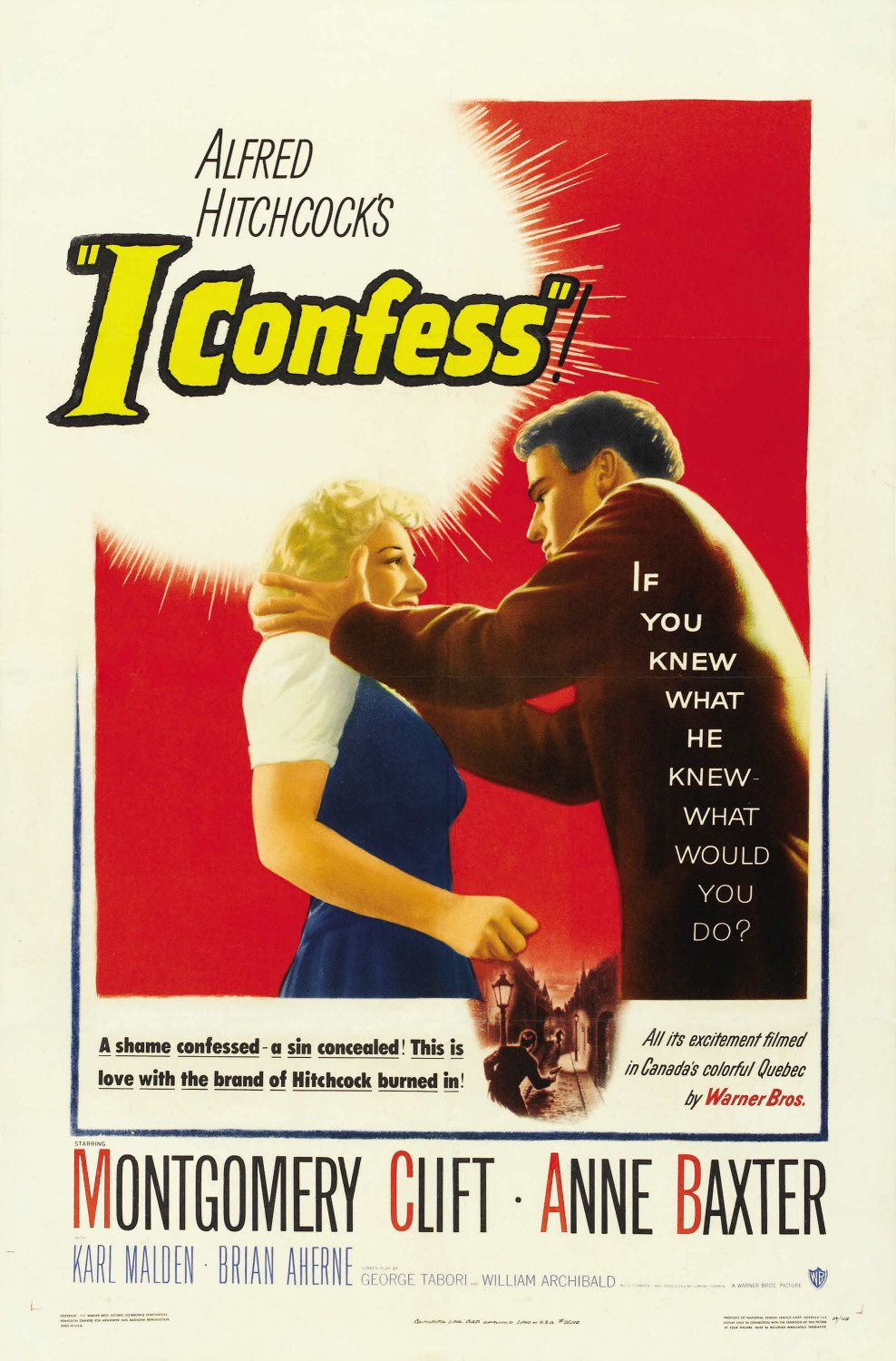
- Theatrical release poster
- Directed by: Alfred Hitchcock
- Screenplay by: George Tabori; William Archibald
- Based on: Nos deux consciences 1902 play by Paul Anthelme
- Produced by: Alfred Hitchcock
- Starring: Montgomery Clift; Anne Baxter; Karl Malden; Brian Aherne; O. E. Hasse
- Cinematography: Robert Burks
- Edited by: Rudi Fehr
- Music by: Dimitri Tiomkin
- Production company: Transatlantic Pictures
- Distributed by: Warner Bros. Pictures
- Release date: February 12, 1953 (Quebec City)
- Running time: 95 minutes
- Country: United States
- Language: English
- Box office: $2 million (US)

I Confess is a 1953 American film noir directed by Alfred Hitchcock, starring Montgomery Clift as Catholic priest Father Michael William Logan, Anne Baxter as Ruth Grandfort, and Karl Malden as Inspector Larrue.

The film is based on a 1902 French play by Paul Anthelme titled Nos deux consciences (Our Two Consciences), which Hitchcock saw in the 1930s. The screenplay was written by George Tabori.

Filming took place largely on location in Quebec City with numerous shots of the city landscape and interiors of its churches, especially St. Zéphirin's and other emblematic buildings, such as the Château Frontenac.

== Plot ==
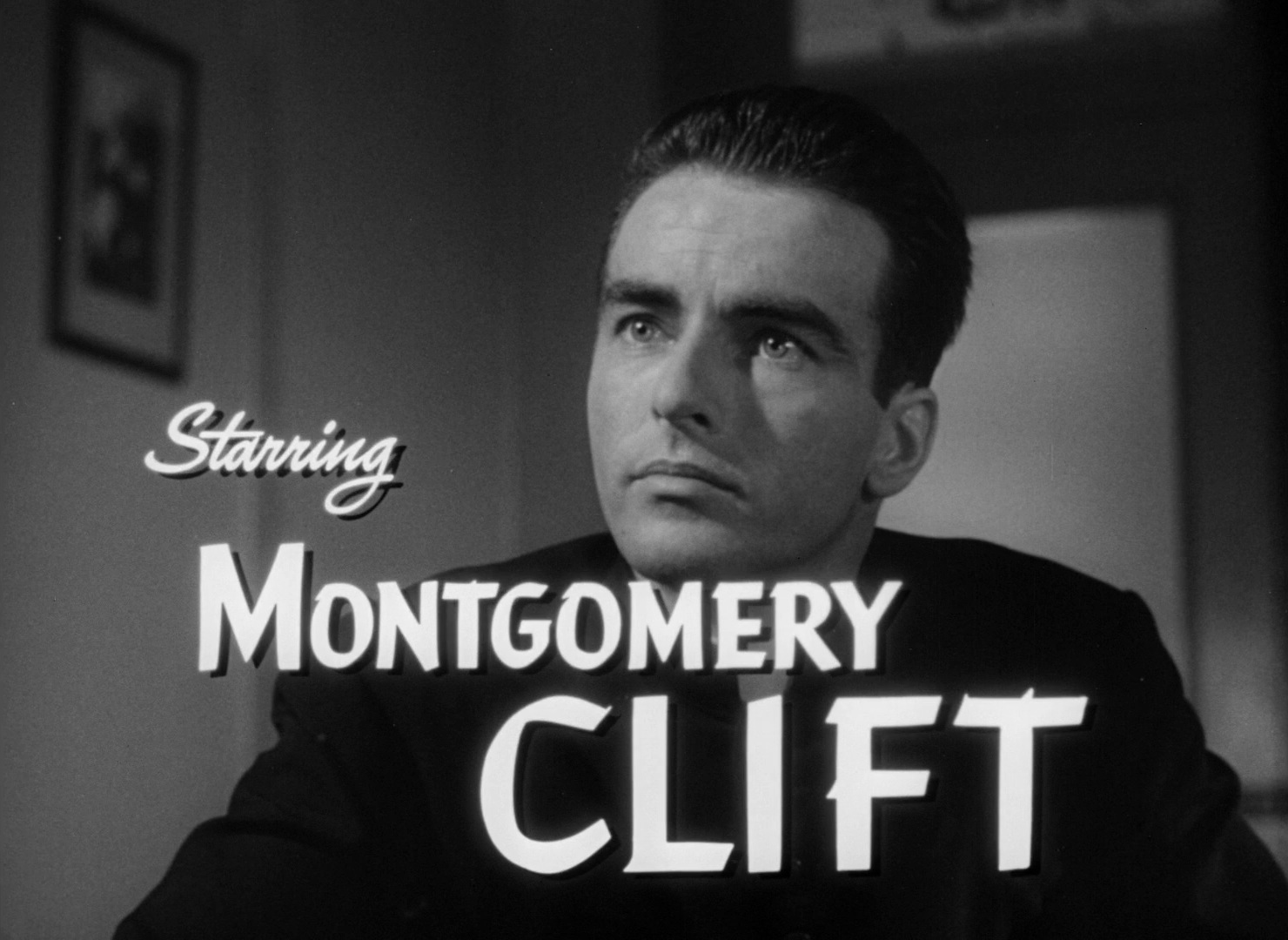
Montgomery Clift in the I Confess film trailer

Father Logan is a devout Catholic priest in Ste. Marie's Church in Quebec City. He employs German immigrant married couple Otto and Alma Keller as caretaker and housekeeper, respectively. Otto Keller also works part-time as a gardener for a shady lawyer, Villette.

The film begins late one evening as a man wearing a cassock walks away from Villette's home with the lawyer dead on the floor inside. Shortly afterward, in the church confessional, Otto confesses to Logan that he accidentally killed Villette while trying to rob him. Otto tells his wife about his deed and assures her that the priest will not say anything because he is required to keep anything revealed during confession inviolate.

The next morning, Otto goes to Villette's house at his regularly scheduled gardening time and reports the death to the police. Logan also goes to the crime scene after hearing Alma mention that her husband is there and finds the police there. Logan is interviewed by Inspector Larrue, who witnesses Logan talking to a woman after he leaves.

At the police station, two young girls tell Larrue they saw a priest leaving Villette's house. This prompts Larrue to call Logan in for more questioning, but Logan refuses to provide any information about the murder. Prematurely suspecting Logan, Larrue orders a detective to follow Logan and contacts Crown Prosecutor Robertson, who is attending a party hosted by Ruth Grandfort, the woman Logan talked to outside of Villette's house, and her husband Pierre, a member of the Quebec legislature. Ruth overhears Robertson discussing Logan, and Larrue's detective discovers her identity by following her home the next day after she meets with Logan to warn him that he is a suspect.

Considering everyone Logan speaks to a suspect, Larrue calls Ruth and Logan in for questioning, and Ruth blurts out the truth, narrating a series of flashbacks: she and Logan fell in love when they were childhood friends, but he went to fight in World War II with the Regina Rifle Regiment and eventually stopped writing to her.

She eventually married Pierre, for whom she had been working as secretary. The day after Logan returned from the war, he and Ruth spent the day on a nearby island. A storm forced them to shelter for the night in a gazebo, and Villette found them there in the morning, recognizing Ruth. The next time Ruth saw Logan was several years later when he was ordained as a priest.

Villette had recently asked Ruth to persuade her husband to help him escape a tax scandal, with the condition that if she refused, he would publicize the night she spent with Logan. She met with Logan on the night of the murder, and Logan agreed to intercede with Villette.

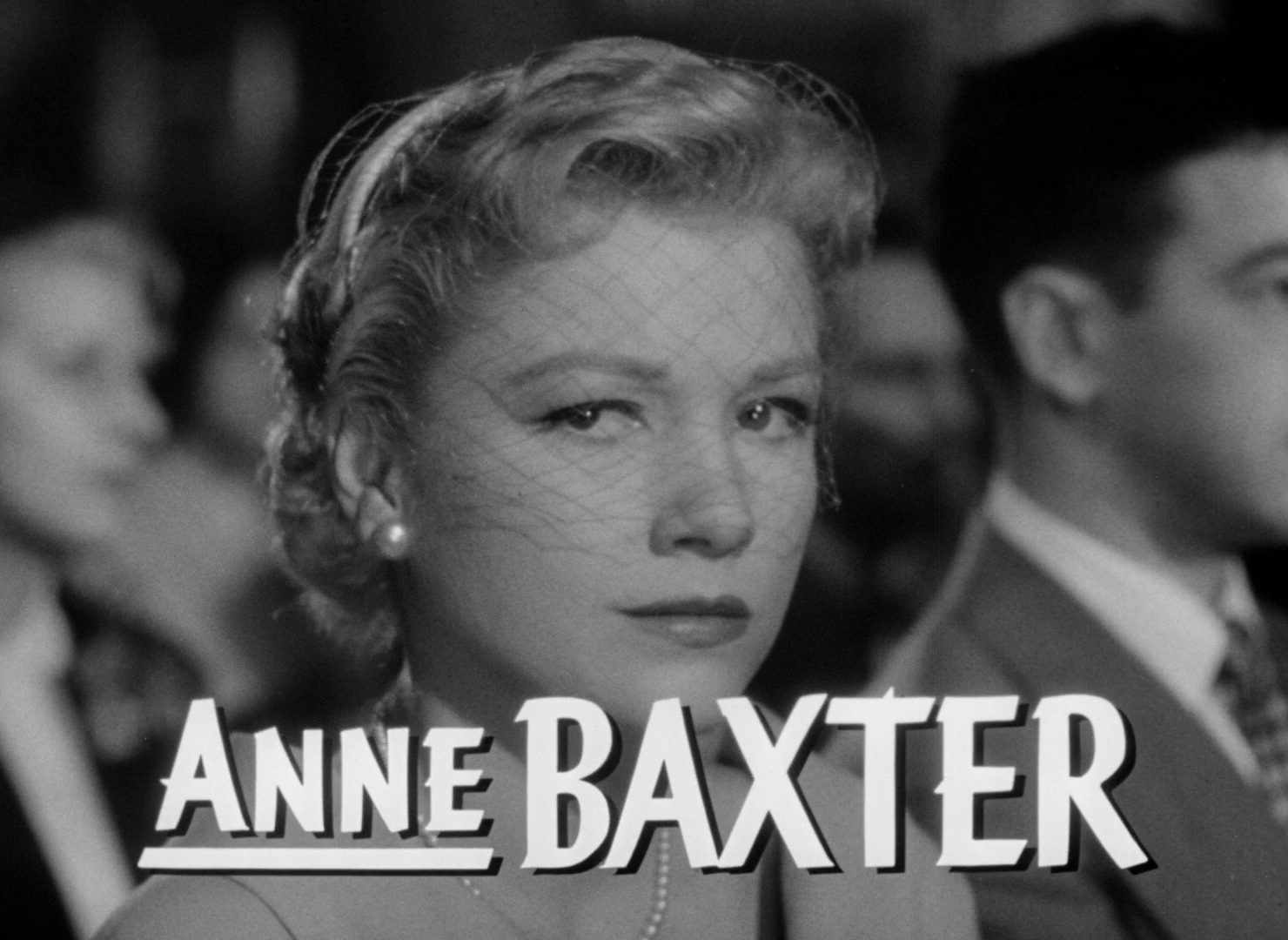
Anne Baxter in the I Confess trailer

Ruth's meeting with Logan occurred between 9 and 11 pm on the night of the murder, but Larrue shows Robinson Villette's autopsy report that indicates that Villette couldn't have died before 11:30 pm. The fact that Ruth and Logan concluded their meeting at 11 pm leaves Logan without an alibi.

Knowing he will be arrested, Logan turns himself in the next day at Larrue's office. Keller has planted the bloody cassock among Logan's belongings, and when Logan is tried in court, Keller testifies that he saw Logan enter the church after the murder, acting suspiciously.

The jury finds Logan not guilty, due to insufficient evidence, but the crowd outside the courthouse mobs Logan as he leaves the court. This upsets Alma to such an extent that she starts to shout that Logan was innocent. Otto, realizing that he's about to be revealed as the murderer, shoots Alma, killing her. While being pursued by police officers, he flees into the Château Frontenac, killing a chef de cuisine in the process.

Larrue finally realizes that Otto is the murderer, corners him in the grand ballroom of the Château Frontenac, and tricks him into confessing the murder. Otto, suspecting that Logan had betrayed him to the police, threatens to shoot him. However, Logan prefers peace over violence, and advances into the ballroom to talk with Otto.

Immediately followed by police officers, Logan talks with Otto, his main intention being to prevent a ballroom gunfight, but Otto shoots at him; a police sharpshooter then shoots Otto, saving Logan's life. Mortally wounded, Otto calls to Logan in extremis and dies immediately after asking him for forgiveness and receiving by him sacramental absolution.

== Cast ==
- Montgomery Clift as Father Michael William Logan
- Anne Baxter as Ruth Grandfort
- Karl Malden as Inspector Larrue
- Brian Aherne as Chief Prosecutor Willy Robertson
- O. E. Hasse as Otto Keller
- Dolly Haas as Alma Keller
- Roger Dann as Pierre Grandfort
- Charles Andre as Father Millars
- Ovila Legare as Monsieur Villette

== Production ==
I Confess had one of the longest pre-productions of any Hitchcock film, with almost 12 writers working on the script for Hitchcock over a period of eight years (Hitchcock had taken time off for the wedding of his daughter Patricia Hitchcock in 1951, and he was in the midst of dissolving his partnership in Transatlantic Pictures with Sidney Bernstein). In the original screenplay, following the source play, the priest and his lover had an illegitimate baby, and the priest was executed at the end of the film. These elements were removed at the insistence of executives at Warner Bros. Pictures, who feared a negative reaction. Hitchcock took inspiration for the jury's verdict from the Pimlico Mystery.

Hitchcock first hired Anita Björk as the female lead after seeing her in Miss Julie (1951). However, when she arrived in Hollywood with her lover, Stig Dagerman, and their baby, Warner Bros. insisted that Hitchcock find another actress for the role.

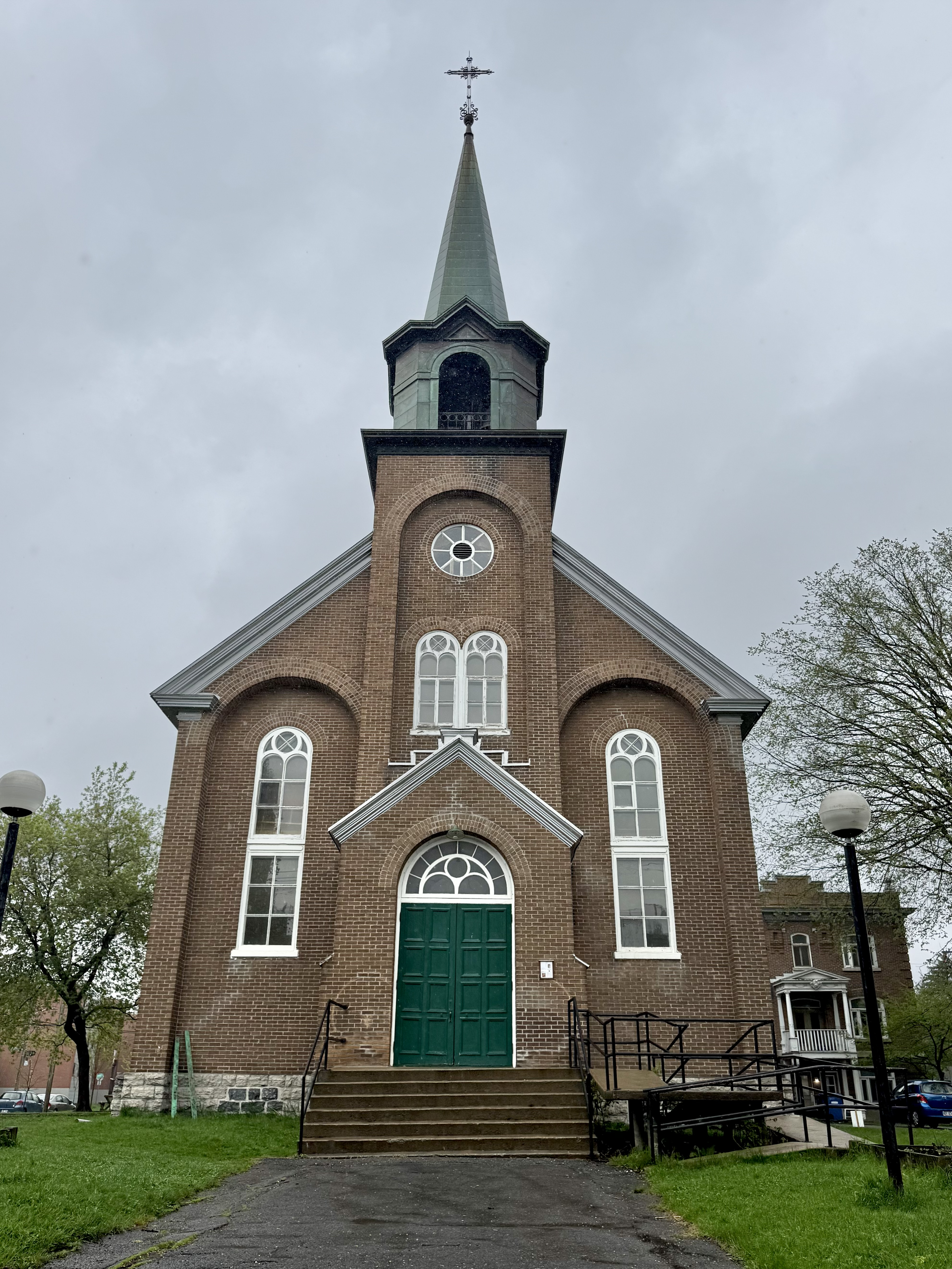
Façade of Église Saint-Zéphirin de Stadacona in Quebec City, featured prominently in Alfred Hitchcock's 1953 film I Confess.

Shooting took place in Hollywood and Quebec from August 21 to October 22, 1952. Hitchcock had planned on using Quebec churches at no cost. When the local diocese read the original script by George Tabori, it objected to the priest's execution and rescinded its permission. When Tabori refused to change the script, Hitchcock brought in William Archibald to rewrite it.

Hitchcock, as was his custom, created detailed storyboards for each scene. He could not understand Clift's Method acting technique and quickly became frustrated with Clift when he blew take after take for failing to follow Hitchcock's instructions.

Cognizant of the difficulty non-Catholics would have in understanding the priest's reluctance to expose Keller, Hitchcock said:

We Catholics know that a priest cannot disclose the secret of the confessional, but the Protestants, the atheists, and the agnostics all say, 'Ridiculous! No man would remain silent and sacrifice his life for such a thing.'

Alfred Hitchcock's cameo appearance occurs during the second minute—right after the opening credits—as he walks across the top of a stairway.

== Reception ==
The film received mixed to negative reviews from critics. Bosley Crowther of The New York Times faulted an "obviously padded" and "a suspenseless script," explaining that "only the most credulous patron will be worried for very long that the hero will not be delivered from his dilemma by some saving grace. And this realization well unburdens the situation of any real suspense." Crowther's review concluded that "Mr. Hitchcock does manage to inject little glints of imagery and invent little twists of construction that give the film the smooth, neat glitter of his style. Shot on location in Quebec, it has a certain atmospheric flavor, too. But it never gets up and goes places. It just ambles and drones along." Variety wrote that the film was "short of the suspense one would expect and overlong on talk," although it did note "a number of top-flight performances." Richard L. Coe of The Washington Post wrote in a negative review that the film "asks for more than the usual suspension of disbelief" because "the priest is not helpless, a fact which the writers and director attempt to forget at the cost of the film's credibility from the earliest reel. It would certainly seem that so young a priest's superiors would have had more to do with his problem, if not at first, surely before the matter came to public trial ... So promising an idea as is the use of the confessional in framing a murder case and respectful as the picture appears to be of matters ecclesiastic, the basic conception is false. The result is a tricked-up picture unworthy of the suave master of movie thrillers." John McCarten of The New Yorker was also negative, writing: "Presumably, this is meant to be a kind of mystery drama. What it actually amounts to, though, is an exposition of the difficulties a priest can get into by keeping the secrets of the confessional inviolate. The theme is prinked up with murder and romance, but neither, as represented here, makes for suspense or entertainment ... it is possible that Montgomery Clift, who plays the part, was ill-advised to portray the priest as a sort of bemused juvenile, plainly too abstracted to lead one lamb, let alone a flock."

A mixed review in The Monthly Film Bulletin declared the film "rather less successful than Strangers on a Train and a good deal more so than anything else Hitchcock has done since the ill-fated Rope ... The final chase through the huge Chateau Frontenac seems a touch that Hitchcock could not resist: out of keeping with the generally somber tone of the film, it provides a showily melodramatic climax. The unresolved split between the straightforward thriller technique and the more penetrating psychological study of character, indeed, makes itself felt as a weakness at intervals throughout the film." The Chicago Tribune also was mixed, declaring that "While it has scenery and carefully allotted bits of tension, the film is crowded and devious plot-wise and doesn't rank with Director Hitchcock's previous bests. The finale is slightly overdone, even if it does manage to bring in a famed hotel."

Philip K. Scheuer of the Los Angeles Times wrote one of the positive reviews, and declared that Hitchcock "has fashioned an absorbing screen drama, one of the solidest and most expertly made of recent weeks. In his careful treatment Hitchcock has gone deeper into human relationships than is usual with him, relying less on the physical chase or on theatrical props like trains and merry-go-rounds than on the interplay of faith and doubt to create his famous brand of suspense." Harrison's Reports wrote: "Living up to his reputation as a master of the suspense film, Alfred Hitchcock has fashioned a powerful dramatic entertainment in I Confess. ... It is not a cheerful picture, but it holds one tense throughout."

Eddie Muller explained that the film "raised to metaphysical heights Hitchcock's perennial theme of unjust fate. It pitted a system of fallible human justice against the conceit of God's divine plan. It's the conundrum at the heart of every Blind Alley thriller: Is there hope of cosmic balance, or is chaos the only true god? The dread this question inspired in Hitchcock twitched beneath even his most diverting escapades."

The film was banned in Ireland because it showed a priest having a relationship with a woman (even though, in the film, the relationship takes place before the character becomes a priest).

The film was entered into the 1953 Cannes Film Festival.

I Confess was a favorite among French New Wave filmmakers, according to filmmaker/historian Peter Bogdanovich.

Film critic Sarah Ortiz has described I Confess as "the most Catholic film of Hitchcock's films." In 2012, The Guardian called the film "A forgotten albeit flawed masterpiece". On Rotten Tomatoes, I Confess holds a rating of 81% from 31 reviews.

== Adaptations ==
I Confess was adapted to the radio program Lux Radio Theatre on September 21, 1953, with Cary Grant in Montgomery Clift's role.

== See also ==
- The Confessional (Le Confessionnal), directed by Robert Lepage, a 1995 film which dramatizes the filming of I Confess as the backdrop for a thematically related story.
