= John McCarten =

American writer (1911–1974)

John McCarten (September 10, 1911, Philadelphia, Pennsylvania – September 25, 1974, New York City) was an American writer who contributed about 1,000 pieces for The New Yorker, serving as the magazine's film critic from 1945 to 1960 and Broadway theatre critic from 1960 to 1967.

McCarten was born in Philadelphia into an Irish-American family. After serving in the Merchant Marine, he started writing for American Mercury, Fortune, and Time during the 1930s.

In 1934, he joined The New Yorker and began contributing satirical short stories and irreverent profiles. He became the magazine's regular film critic in 1945, employing a writing style that tended to be terse and was often condescending. He gained a reputation as something of a nemesis of Alfred Hitchcock in particular, whose films McCarten regularly panned. The screenplay for the 1956 British romantic comedy film The Silken Affair was adapted from an idea by McCarten.

In 1960, McCarten switched to theatre criticism, where he was no less tough; on one occasion, theatrical producer David Merrick had McCarten barred from the opening night of Do Re Mi.

In July 1967, McCarten suddenly quit reviewing and moved to Ireland. The following year, he submitted the first of his "Irish Sketches", a series of light pieces about Irish art and culture that ran in The New Yorker between February 24, 1968, and November 20, 1971.

== Death ==
John McCarten died of cancer at the age of 63. He married three times and had two sons. His obituary in The New Yorker remembered him as "a witty writer, whose sharpest weapon was mockery. Yet, given the force of the opinions he would pronounce in conversation, one marveled to observe his comparative gentleness in print. For, much as he might deplore certain human failings, he could never bear to injure those who embodied them. He learned to tell the truth about people in such a way that, far from feeling savaged, they felt praised."

== Bibliography ==
- McCarten, John (February 4, 1950). "Eliot and Guinness". The New Yorker. 25 (50): 25–26.
