= Alfred Hitchcock =

English filmmaker (1899–1980)

Sir Alfred Hitchcock KBE
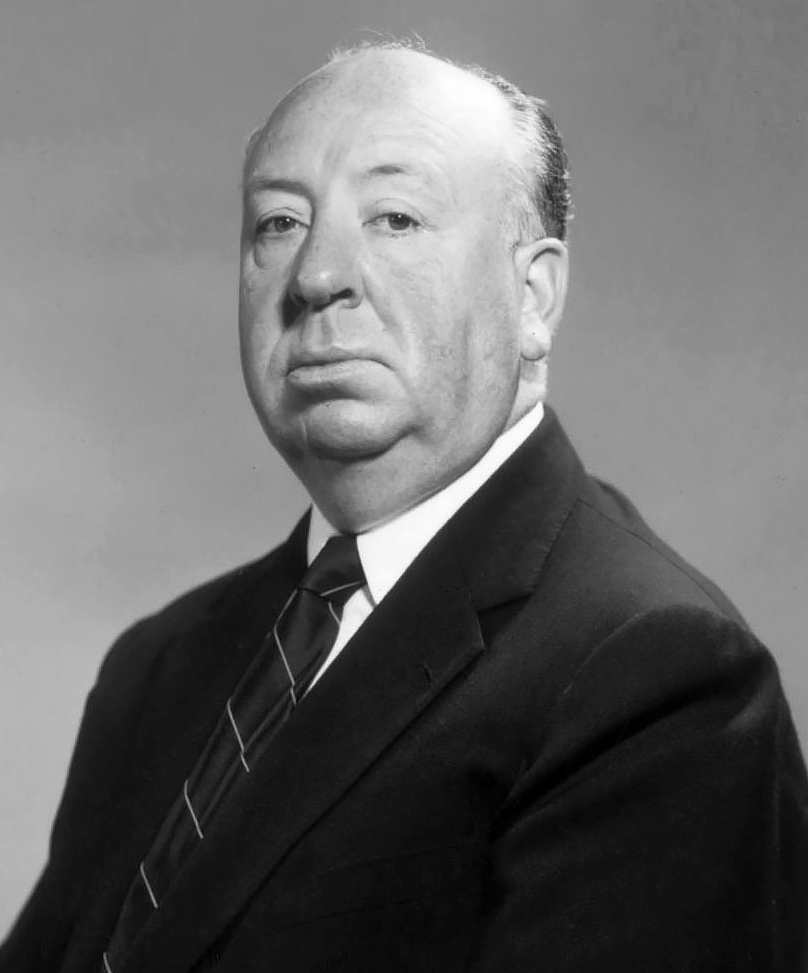
- Hitchcock, c. 1960s
- Born: Alfred Joseph Hitchcock; 13 August 1899; Leytonstone, Essex, England
- Died: 29 April 1980 (aged 80); Los Angeles, California, US
- Citizenship: UK; US (from 1955)
- Occupations: Film director; producer
- Years active: 1919–1980
- Works: Full list
- Spouse: Alma Reville (m. 1926)
- Children: Pat Hitchcock
- Awards: Full list

Sir Alfred Joseph Hitchcock (13 August 1899 – 29 April 1980) was an English filmmaker. He is widely regarded as one of the greatest and most influential figures in the history of cinema. In a career spanning six decades, he directed over 50 feature films, (Note: According to Gene Adair (2002), Hitchcock made 53 feature films. According to Roger Ebert in 1980, it was 54.) many of which are still widely watched and studied today. Known as the "Master of Suspense", Hitchcock became as well known as any of his actors thanks to his many interviews, his cameo appearances often near the beginning of his films, and his hosting and producing the television anthology Alfred Hitchcock Presents (1955–65). Among other accolades, his films garnered 46 Academy Award nominations, including six wins, although he never won the award for Best Director, despite five nominations.

Hitchcock initially trained as a technical clerk and copywriter before entering the film industry in 1919 as a title card designer. His directorial debut was the British–German silent film The Pleasure Garden (1926). His first successful film, The Lodger: A Story of the London Fog (1927), helped to shape the thriller genre, and Blackmail (1929) was the first British "talkie". His thrillers The 39 Steps (1935) and The Lady Vanishes (1938) are ranked among the greatest British films of the 20th century. By 1939, he had earned international recognition, and producer David O. Selznick persuaded him to move to Hollywood. A string of successful films followed, including Rebecca (1940), Foreign Correspondent (1940), Suspicion (1941), Shadow of a Doubt (1943) and Notorious (1946). Rebecca won the Academy Award for Best Picture, with Hitchcock nominated as Best Director. He also received Oscar nominations for Lifeboat (1944), Spellbound (1945), Rear Window (1954) and Psycho (1960).

Hitchcock's other notable films include Rope (1948), Strangers on a Train (1951), Dial M for Murder (1954), To Catch a Thief (1955), The Trouble with Harry (1955), Vertigo (1958), North by Northwest (1959), The Birds (1963), Marnie (1964) and Frenzy (1972), all of which were also financially successful and are highly regarded by film historians. Hitchcock made a number of films with some of the biggest stars in Hollywood, including four with Cary Grant, four with James Stewart, three with Ingrid Bergman and three consecutively with Grace Kelly. Hitchcock became an American citizen in 1955.

In 2012, Hitchcock's psychological thriller Vertigo, starring Stewart, displaced Orson Welles' Citizen Kane (1941) as the British Film Institute's greatest film ever made based on its world-wide poll of hundreds of film critics. As of 2021, nine of his films had been selected for preservation in the United States National Film Registry, (Note: The films selected for the National Film Registry are Rebecca (1940), Shadow of a Doubt (1943), Notorious (1946), Strangers on a Train (1951), Rear Window (1954), Vertigo (1958), North by Northwest (1959), Psycho (1960) and The Birds (1963).) including his personal favourite, Shadow of a Doubt (1943). (Note: Alfred Hitchcock (North American Newspaper Alliance, 16 July 1972): "My own favorite is Shadow of a Doubt. You never saw it? Ah. It was written by Thornton Wilder. It's a character study, a suspense thriller. The beauty of the film was it was shot in the actual town.") He received the BAFTA Fellowship in 1971, the AFI Life Achievement Award in 1979, and was knighted in December of that year, four months before his death on 29 April 1980.

== Life and career ==
=== Early life: 1899–1919 ===
==== Early childhood and education ====
Alfred Joseph Hitchcock was born on 13 August 1899 at the flat above his parents' leased greengrocer's shop at 517 High Road in Leytonstone, an area in Essex. He was the son of greengrocer and poulterer, William Edgar Hitchcock (1862–1914) and Emma Jane Whelan (1863–1942). The household was "characterised by an atmosphere of discipline". He had an older brother named William John (1888–1943) and an older sister named Ellen Kathleen (1892–1979) who used the nickname "Nellie". His parents were both Roman Catholics with English and Irish ancestry. His father was a greengrocer, as his grandfather had been. There was a large extended family, including uncle John Hitchcock with his five-bedroom Victorian house on Campion Road in Putney, complete with a maid, cook, chauffeur, and gardener. Every summer, his uncle rented a seaside house for the family in Cliftonville, Kent. Hitchcock said that he first became class-conscious there, noticing the differences between tourists and locals.

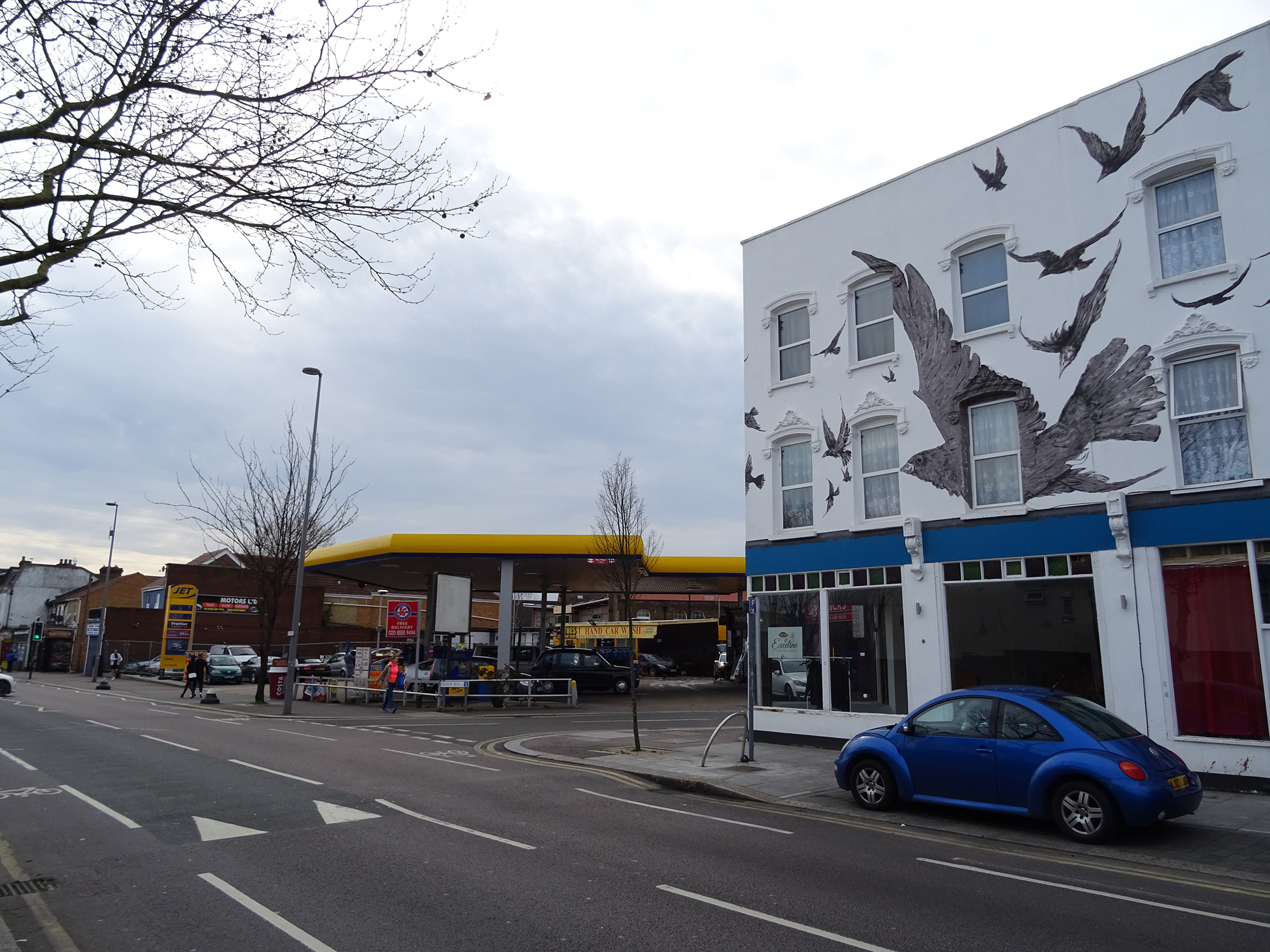
Petrol station at the site of 517 High Road, Leytonstone, where Hitchcock was born; commemorative mural at nos. 527–533 (right)

Describing himself as a well-behaved boy – his father called him his "little lamb without a spot" – Hitchcock said he could not remember ever having had a playmate. One of his favourite stories for interviewers was about his father sending him to the local police station with a note when he was five; the policeman looked at the note and locked him in a cell for a few minutes, saying, "This is what we do to naughty boys." The experience left him with a lifelong phobia of law enforcement, and he told Tom Snyder in 1973 that he was "scared stiff of anything ... to do with the law" and that he would refuse to even drive a car in case he got a parking ticket. When he was six, the family moved to Limehouse and leased two stores at 130 and 175 Salmon Lane, which they ran as a fish-and-chip shop and fishmongers' respectively; they lived above the former. Hitchcock attended his first school, the Howrah House Convent in Poplar, which he entered in 1907, at age 7. According to biographer Patrick McGilligan, he stayed at Howrah House for at most two years. He also attended a convent school, the Wode Street School "for the daughters of gentlemen and little boys" run by the Faithful Companions of Jesus. He then attended a primary school near his home and was for a short time a boarder at Salesian College in Battersea.

The family moved again when Hitchcock was eleven, this time to Stepney, and on 5 October 1910 he was sent to St Ignatius College in Stamford Hill, a Jesuit grammar school with a reputation for discipline. As corporal punishment, the priests used a flat, hard, springy tool made of gutta-percha and known as a "ferula" which struck the whole palm; punishment was always at the end of the day, so the boys had to sit through classes anticipating the punishment if they had been written up for it. He later said that this is where he developed his sense of fear. The school register lists his year of birth as 1900 rather than 1899; biographer Donald Spoto says he was deliberately enrolled as a ten-year-old because he was a year behind with his schooling. While biographer Gene Adair reports that Hitchcock was "an average, or slightly above-average, pupil", Hitchcock said that he was "usually among the four or five at the top of the class"; at the end of his first year, his work in Latin, English, French and religious education was noted. He told Peter Bogdanovich: "The Jesuits taught me organisation, control and, to some degree, analysis."

Hitchcock's favourite subject was geography and he became interested in maps and the timetables of trains, trams and buses; according to John Russell Taylor, he could recite all the stops on the Orient Express. He had a particular interest in London trams. An overwhelming majority of his films include rail or tram scenes, in particular The Lady Vanishes, Strangers on a Train and Number Seventeen. A clapperboard shows the number of the scene and the number of takes, and Hitchcock would often take the two numbers on the clapperboard and whisper the London tram route names. For example, if the clapperboard showed "Scene 23; Take 3", he would whisper "Woodford, Hampstead"—Woodford being the terminus of the route 23 tram, and Hampstead the end of route 3.

==== Henley's ====
Hitchcock told his parents that he wanted to be an engineer, and on 25 July 1913, he left St Ignatius and enrolled in night classes at the London County Council School of Engineering and Navigation in Poplar. In a book-length interview in 1962, he told François Truffaut that he had studied "mechanics, electricity, acoustics, and navigation". Then, on 12 December 1914, his father, who had been suffering from emphysema and kidney disease, died at the age of 52. To support himself and his mother – his older siblings had left home by then – Hitchcock took a job, for 15 shillings a week (£75 in 2025), as a technical clerk at the Henley Telegraph and Cable Company in Blomfield Street, near London Wall. He continued night classes, this time in art history, painting, economics and political science. His older brother ran the family shops, while he and his mother continued to live in Salmon Lane.

Hitchcock was too young to enlist when the First World War started in July 1914, and when he reached the required age of 18 in 1917, he received a C3 classification ("free from serious organic disease, able to stand service conditions in garrisons at home ... only suitable for sedentary work"). He joined a cadet regiment of the Royal Engineers and took part in theoretical briefings, weekend drills and exercises. John Russell Taylor wrote that, in one session of practical exercises in Hyde Park, Hitchcock was required to wear puttees. He could never master wrapping them around his legs, and they repeatedly fell down around his ankles.

After the war, Hitchcock took an interest in creative writing. In June 1919, he became a founding editor and business manager of Henley's in-house publication, The Henley Telegraph (sixpence a copy), to which he submitted several short stories. (Note: In his first story, "Gas" (June 1919), published in the first issue, a young woman is being assaulted by a mob of men in Paris, only to find she has been hallucinating in the dentist's chair. This was followed by "The Woman's Part" (September 1919), which describes a husband watching his wife, an actor, perform on stage. "Sordid" (February 1920) concerns an attempt to buy a sword from an antiques dealer, with another twist ending. "And There Was No Rainbow" (September 1920) finds Bob caught in flagrante with a friend's wife. In "What's Who?" (December 1920), confusion reigns when a group of actors impersonate themselves. "The History of Pea Eating" (December 1920) is a satire on the difficulty of eating peas. His final piece, "Fedora" (March 1921) describes an unknown woman: "small, simple, unassuming, and noiseless, yet she commands profound attention on all sides".) Henley's promoted him to the advertising department, where he wrote copy and drew graphics for electric cable advertisements. He enjoyed the job and would stay late at the office to examine the proofs; he told Truffaut that this was his "first step toward cinema". He enjoyed watching films, especially American cinema, and from the age of 16 read the trade papers; he watched Charlie Chaplin, D. W. Griffith and Buster Keaton, and particularly liked Fritz Lang's Der müde Tod (released in Britain in 1921 as Destiny).

=== Inter-war career: 1919–1939 ===
==== Famous Players–Lasky ====
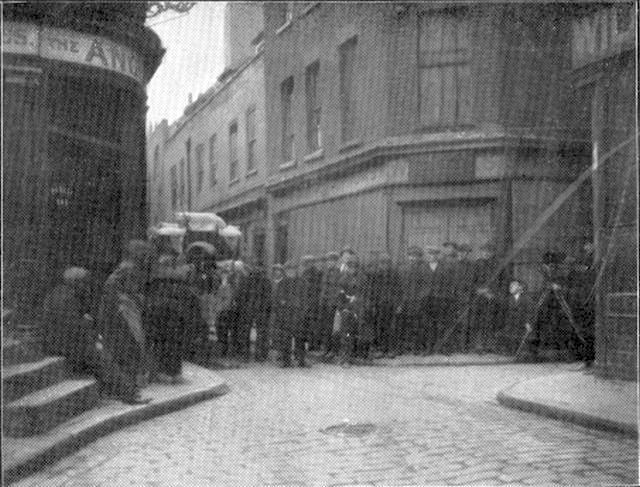
Hitchcock (right) during the making of Number 13 in London

While still at Henley's, he read in a trade paper that Famous Players–Lasky, the production arm of Paramount Pictures, was opening a studio in London. They were planning to film The Sorrows of Satan by Marie Corelli, so he produced some drawings for the title cards and sent his work to the studio. They hired him, and in 1919 he began working for Islington Studios in Poole Street, Hoxton, as a title-card designer.

Donald Spoto wrote that most of the staff were Americans with strict job specifications, but the English workers were encouraged to try their hand at anything, which meant that Hitchcock gained experience as a co-writer, art director and production manager on at least 18 silent films. The Times wrote in February 1922 about the studio's "special art title department under the supervision of Mr. A. J. Hitchcock". His work included Number 13 (1922), also known as Mrs. Peabody; it was cancelled because of financial problems - the few finished scenes are lost – and Always Tell Your Wife (1923), which he and Seymour Hicks finished together when Hicks was about to give up on it. Hicks wrote later about being helped by "a fat youth who was in charge of the property room ... [n]one other than Alfred Hitchcock".

==== Gainsborough Pictures and work in Germany ====
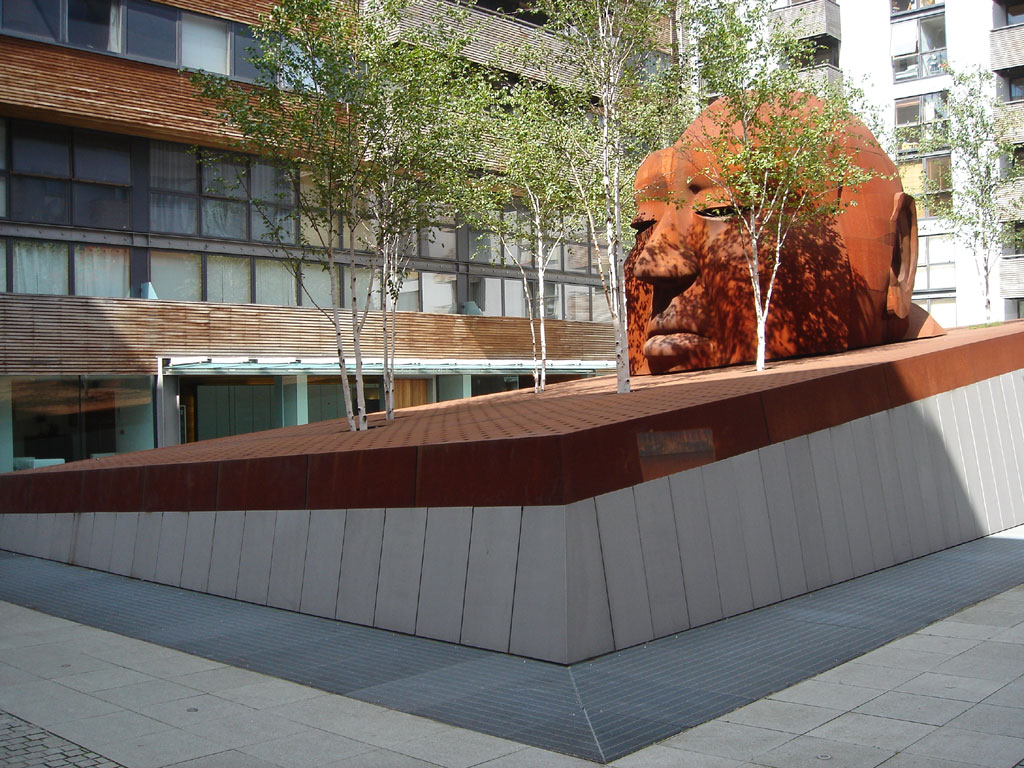
Hitchcock sculpture at the site of Gainsborough Pictures, Poole Street, Hoxton, north London

When Paramount pulled out of London in 1922, Hitchcock was hired as an assistant director by a new firm run in the same location by Michael Balcon, later known as Gainsborough Pictures. Hitchcock worked on Woman to Woman (1923) with the director Graham Cutts, designing the set, writing the script and producing. He said: "It was the first film that I had really got my hands onto." The editor and "script girl" on Woman to Woman was Alma Reville, his future wife. He also worked as an assistant to Cutts on The White Shadow (1924), The Passionate Adventure (1924), The Blackguard (1925) and The Prude's Fall (1925). The Blackguard was produced at the Babelsberg Studios in Potsdam, where Hitchcock watched part of the making of F. W. Murnau's The Last Laugh (1924). He was impressed with Murnau's work, and later used many of his techniques for the set design in his own productions.

In the summer of 1925, Balcon asked Hitchcock to direct The Pleasure Garden (1926), starring Virginia Valli, a co-production of Gainsborough and the German firm Emelka at the Geiselgasteig studio near Munich. Reville, by then Hitchcock's fiancée, was assistant director-editor. Although the film was a commercial flop, Balcon liked Hitchcock's work; a Daily Express headline called him the "Young man with a master mind". On an early sign of his high profile, the British Film Institute (BFI) would write, "In an unusual display of confidence for a first time director, Hitchcock included his own signature in the titles." In March 1926, the British film magazine Picturegoer ran an article entitled "Alfred the Great" by the film critic Cedric Belfrage, who praised Hitchcock for possessing "such a complete grasp of all the different branches of film technique that he is able to take far more control of his production than the average director of four times his experience." Production of The Pleasure Garden encountered obstacles which Hitchcock would later learn from: on arrival to Brenner Pass, he failed to declare his film stock to customs and it was confiscated; one actress could not enter the water for a scene because she was on her period; budget overruns meant that he had to borrow money from the actors. Hitchcock also needed a translator to give instructions to the cast and crew.

In Germany, Hitchcock observed the nuances of German cinema and filmmaking which had a big influence on him. When he was not working, he would visit Berlin's art galleries, concerts and museums. He would also meet with actors, writers and producers to build connections. Balcon asked him to direct a second film in Munich, The Mountain Eagle (1926), based on an original story titled Fear o' God. The film is lost, and Hitchcock called it "a very bad movie". A year later, Hitchcock wrote and directed The Ring; although the screenplay was credited solely to his name, Elliot Stannard assisted him with the writing. The Ring garnered positive reviews; the Bioscope critic called it "the most magnificent British film ever made".

When he returned to England, Hitchcock was one of the early members of the London Film Society, newly formed in 1925. Through the Society, he became fascinated by the work of Soviet filmmakers Dziga Vertov, Lev Kuleshov, Sergei Eisenstein and Vsevolod Pudovkin. He would also socialise with fellow English filmmakers Ivor Montagu, Adrian Brunel and Walter Mycroft. Hitchcock recognised the value in cultivating his own brand, with the director aggressively promoting himself during this period. In a 1925 London Film Society meeting he declared directors were what mattered most in making films, with Donald Spoto writing that Hitchcock proclaimed, "We make a film succeed. The name of the director should be associated in the public's mind with a quality product. Actors come and go, but the name of the director should stay clearly in the mind of the audience."

Visually, it was extraordinarily imaginative for the time, most notably in the scene in which Hitchcock installed a glass floor so that he could show the lodger pacing up and down in his room from below, as though overheard by his landlady.

— BFI entry for Hitchcock's first thriller, The Lodger: A Story of the London Fog (1927)

Hitchcock established himself as a name director with his first thriller, The Lodger: A Story of the London Fog (1927). The film concerns the hunt for a Jack the Ripper-style serial killer who, wearing a black cloak and carrying a black bag, is murdering young blonde women in London, and only on Tuesdays. A landlady suspects that her lodger is the killer, but he turns out to be innocent. Hitchcock had wanted the leading man to be guilty, or for the film at least to end ambiguously, but the star was Ivor Novello, a matinée idol, and the "star system" meant that Novello could not be the villain. Hitchcock told Truffaut: "You have to clearly spell it out in big letters: 'He is innocent.'" (He had the same problem years later with Cary Grant in Suspicion (1941).) Released in January 1927, The Lodger was a commercial and critical success in the UK. Upon its release, the trade journal Bioscope wrote: "It is possible that this film is the finest British production ever made". Hitchcock told Truffaut that the film was the first of his to be influenced by German Expressionism: "In truth, you might almost say that The Lodger was my first picture." In a strategy for self-publicity, The Lodger saw him make his first cameo appearance in a film, where he sat in a newsroom.

Continuing to market his brand following the success of The Lodger, Hitchcock wrote a letter to the London Evening News in November 1927 about his filmmaking, participated in studio-produced publicity, and by December 1927 he developed the original sketch of his widely recognised profile which he introduced by sending it to friends and colleagues as a Christmas present.

==== Marriage ====
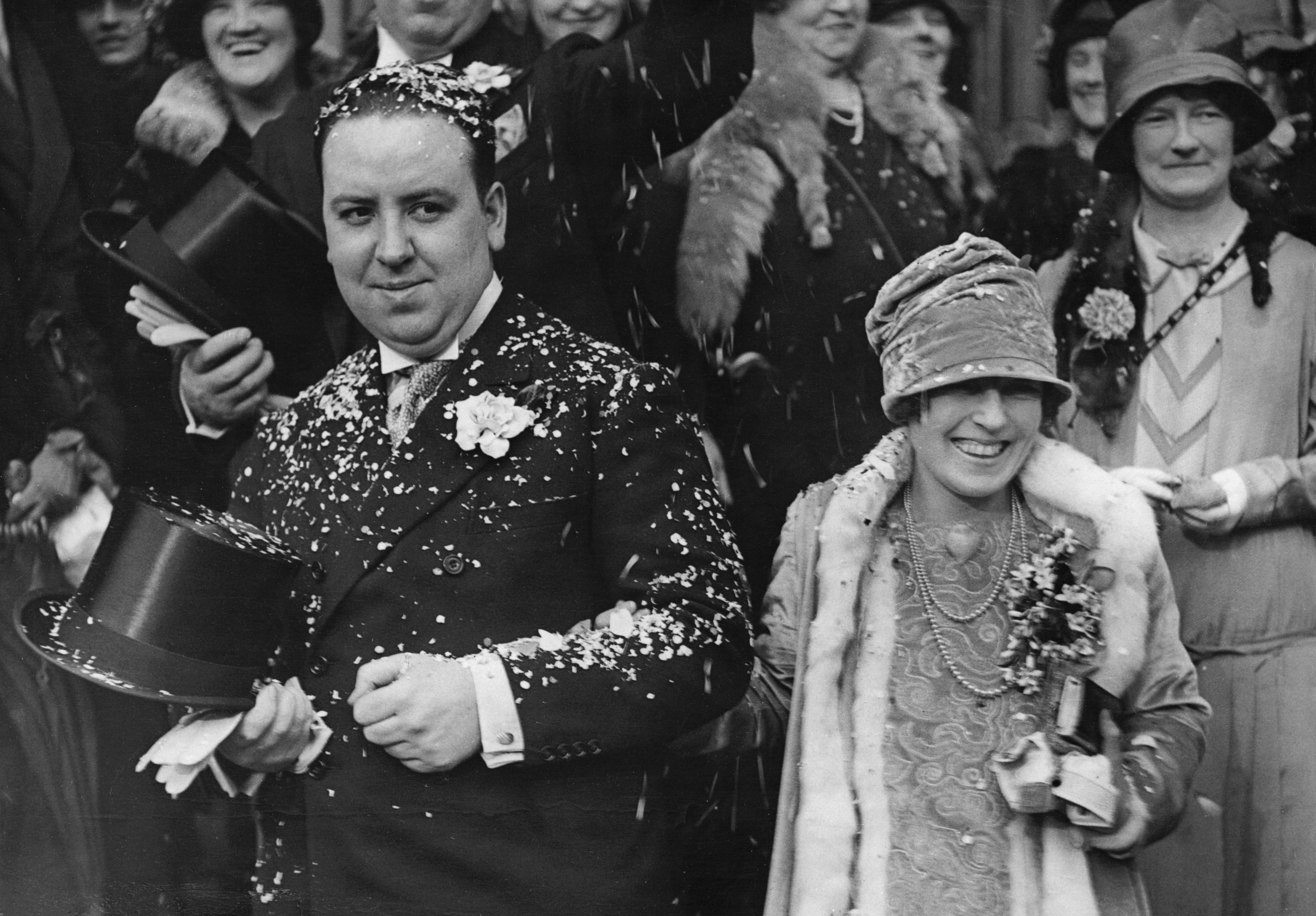
Hitchcock and Reville on their wedding day, Brompton Oratory, 2 December 1926

On 2 December 1926, Hitchcock married the English screenwriter Alma Reville at the Brompton Oratory in South Kensington. The couple honeymooned in Paris, Lake Como and St. Moritz, before returning to London to live in a leased flat on the top two floors of 153 Cromwell Road, Kensington. Reville, who was born just hours after Hitchcock, converted from Protestantism to Catholicism, apparently at the insistence of Hitchcock's mother; she was baptised on 31 May 1927 and confirmed at Westminster Cathedral by Cardinal Francis Bourne on 5 June.

In 1928, when they learned that Reville was pregnant, the Hitchcocks purchased "Winter's Grace", a Tudor farmhouse set in eleven acres on Stroud Lane, Shamley Green, Surrey, for £2,500. Their daughter and only child, Patricia (Pat) Alma Hitchcock, was born on 7 July that year. Pat died on 9 August 2021 at the age of 93.

Reville became her husband's closest collaborator; Charles Champlin wrote in 1982: "The Hitchcock touch had four hands, and two were Alma's." When Hitchcock accepted the AFI Life Achievement Award in 1979, he said that he wanted to mention "four people who have given me the most affection, appreciation and encouragement, and constant collaboration. The first of the four is a film editor, the second is a scriptwriter, the third is the mother of my daughter, Pat, and the fourth is as fine a cook as ever performed miracles in a domestic kitchen. And their names are Alma Reville." Reville wrote or co-wrote on many of Hitchcock's films, including Shadow of a Doubt, Suspicion and The 39 Steps.

==== Early sound films ====
Hitchcock began work on his tenth film, Blackmail (1929), when its production company, British International Pictures (BIP), converted its Elstree studios to sound. The film was the first British "talkie"; this followed the rapid development of sound films in the United States, from the use of brief sound segments in The Jazz Singer (1927) to the first full sound feature Lights of New York (1928). Blackmail began the Hitchcock tradition of using famous landmarks as a backdrop for suspense sequences, which includes an early example of a red telephone box being used for criminal activity, while the climax takes place on the dome of the British Museum. It also features one of his longest cameo appearances, which shows him being bothered by a small boy as he reads a book on the London Underground. In the PBS series The Men Who Made The Movies, Hitchcock explained how he used early sound recording as a special element of the film to create tension, with a gossipy woman (Phyllis Monkman) stressing the word "knife" in her conversation with the woman suspected of murder. During this period, Hitchcock directed segments for a BIP revue, Elstree Calling (1930), and directed a short film, An Elastic Affair (1930), featuring two Film Weekly scholarship winners. An Elastic Affair is one of the lost films.

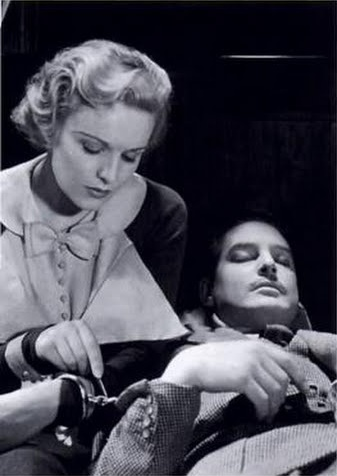
Madeleine Carroll (the archetypal "Hitchcock blonde") and Robert Donat in The 39 Steps (1935)

In 1933, Hitchcock signed a multi-film contract with Gaumont-British, once again working for Michael Balcon. His first film for the company, The Man Who Knew Too Much (1934), was a success; his second, The 39 Steps (1935), was acclaimed in the UK, and gained him recognition in the US. The latter starred the quintessential English "Hitchcock blonde", Madeleine Carroll, who was the template for his succession of ice-cold, elegant leading ladies. Screenwriter Robert Towne remarked: "It's not much of an exaggeration to say that all contemporary escapist entertainment begins with The 39 Steps". John Buchan, author of The Thirty-Nine Steps on which the film is loosely based, met with Hitchcock on set, and attended the high-profile premiere at the New Gallery Cinema in London. Upon viewing the film, the author said it had improved on the book. This film was one of the first to introduce the "MacGuffin" plot device, a term coined by the English screenwriter and Hitchcock collaborator Angus MacPhail. The MacGuffin is an item or goal the protagonist is pursuing, one that otherwise has no narrative value; in The 39 Steps, the MacGuffin is a stolen set of design plans.

Hitchcock released two spy thrillers in 1936. Sabotage was loosely based on Joseph Conrad's novel, The Secret Agent (1907), about a woman who discovers that her husband is a terrorist, and Secret Agent, based on two stories in Ashenden: Or the British Agent (1928) by W. Somerset Maugham. (Note: In 2017, a Time Out magazine poll ranked Sabotage as the 44th best British film ever.) In his positive review of Sabotage for The Spectator, the writer and journalist Graham Greene identified the children's matinée scene as an "ingenious and pathetic twist stamped as Mr Hitchcock's own". Secret Agent starred Madeleine Carroll and John Gielgud, with Peter Lorre playing Gielgud's deranged assistant, and typical Hitchcockian themes include mistaken identity, trains and a "Hitchcock blonde".

At this time, Hitchcock also became notorious for pranks against the cast and crew. These jokes ranged from simple and innocent to crazy and maniacal. For instance, he hosted a dinner party where he dyed all the food blue because he claimed there weren't enough blue foods. He also had a horse delivered to the dressing room of his friend, actor Gerald du Maurier. Hitchcock's next film, Young and Innocent (1937), was a crime thriller based on the 1936 novel A Shilling for Candles by Josephine Tey. Starring Nova Pilbeam and Derrick De Marney, the film was relatively enjoyable for the cast and crew to make. To meet distribution purposes in America, the film's runtime was cut and this included removal of one of Hitchcock's favourite scenes: a children's tea party which becomes menacing to the protagonists.

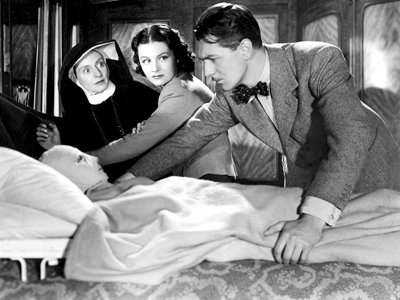
Margaret Lockwood (middle) and Michael Redgrave (right) in a publicity shot for The Lady Vanishes (1938)

Hitchcock's next major success was The Lady Vanishes (1938), "one of the greatest train movies from the genre's golden era", according to Philip French, in which Miss Froy (May Whitty), a British spy posing as a governess, disappears on a train journey through the fictional European country of Bandrika. The film saw Hitchcock receive the 1938 New York Film Critics Circle Award for Best Director. Benjamin Crisler of The New York Times wrote in June 1938: "Three unique and valuable institutions the British have that we in America have not: Magna Carta, the Tower Bridge and Alfred Hitchcock, the greatest director of screen melodramas in the world." The film was based on the novel The Wheel Spins (1936) written by Ethel Lina White, and starred Michael Redgrave (in his film debut) and Margaret Lockwood.

By 1938, Hitchcock was aware that he had reached his peak in Britain. He had received numerous offers from producers in the United States, but he turned them all down because he disliked the contractual obligations or thought the projects were repellent. However, producer David O. Selznick offered him a concrete proposal to make a film based on the sinking of RMS Titanic, which was eventually shelved, but Selznick persuaded Hitchcock to come to Hollywood. In June 1938, Hitchcock sailed to New York aboard the RMS Queen Mary, and found that he was already a celebrity; he was featured in magazines and gave interviews to radio stations. In Hollywood, Hitchcock met Selznick for the first time. Selznick offered him a four-film contract, approximately $40,000 for each picture (equivalent to $910,000 in 2025). Before finalising any American deal, Hitchcock had one last film to make in England, as director of the Charles Laughton-produced picture Jamaica Inn (1939), which he had signed on to make in May 1938, right before his first trip to the US.

=== Early Hollywood years: 1939–1945 ===
==== Selznick contract ====
Selznick signed Hitchcock to a seven-year contract beginning in April 1939, and the Hitchcocks moved to Hollywood. The Hitchcocks lived in a spacious flat on Wilshire Boulevard, and slowly acclimatised themselves to the Los Angeles area. He and his wife Alma kept a low profile, and were not interested in attending parties or being celebrities. Hitchcock discovered his taste for fine food in West Hollywood, but still carried on his way of life from England. He was impressed with Hollywood's filmmaking culture, expansive budgets and efficiency, compared to the limits that he had often faced in Britain. In June that year, Life called him the "greatest master of melodrama in screen history".

Although Hitchcock and Selznick respected each other, their working arrangements were sometimes difficult. Selznick suffered from constant financial problems, and Hitchcock was often unhappy about Selznick's creative control and interference over his films. Selznick was also displeased with Hitchcock's method of shooting just what was in the script, and nothing more, which meant that the film could not be cut and remade differently at a later time. As well as complaining about Hitchcock's "goddamn jigsaw cutting", their personalities were mismatched: Hitchcock was reserved whereas Selznick was flamboyant. Eventually, Selznick generously lent Hitchcock to the larger film studios. Selznick made only a few films each year, as did fellow independent producer Samuel Goldwyn, so he did not always have projects for Hitchcock to direct. Goldwyn had also negotiated with Hitchcock on a possible contract, only to be outbid by Selznick. In a later interview, Hitchcock said: "[Selznick] was the Big Producer. ... Producer was king. The most flattering thing Mr. Selznick ever said about me—and it shows you the amount of control—he said I was the 'only director' he'd 'trust with a film'."

Trailer for Rebecca (1940)

Hitchcock approached American cinema cautiously; his first American film was set in England in which the "Americanness" of the characters was incidental: Rebecca (1940) was set in a Hollywood version of England's Cornwall and based on a novel by English novelist Daphne du Maurier. Selznick insisted on a faithful adaptation of the book, and disagreed with Hitchcock with the use of humour. The film, starring Laurence Olivier and Joan Fontaine, concerns an unnamed naïve young woman who marries a widowed aristocrat. She lives in his large English country house, and struggles with the lingering reputation of his elegant and worldly first wife Rebecca, who died under mysterious circumstances. The film won Best Picture at the 13th Academy Awards; the statuette was given to producer Selznick. Hitchcock received his first nomination for Best Director, his first of five such nominations.

Hitchcock's second American film was the thriller Foreign Correspondent (1940), set in Europe, based on Vincent Sheean's book Personal History (1935) and produced by Walter Wanger. It was nominated for Best Picture that year. Hitchcock felt uneasy living and working in Hollywood while Britain was at war; his concern resulted in a film that overtly supported the British war effort. Filmed in 1939, it was inspired by the rapidly changing events in Europe, as covered by an American newspaper reporter played by Joel McCrea. By mixing footage of European scenes with scenes filmed on a Hollywood backlot, the film avoided direct references to Nazism, Nazi Germany and Germans, to comply with the Motion Picture Production Code at the time.

==== Early war years ====
In September 1940, the Hitchcocks bought the 200-acre (0.81 km^{2}) Cornwall Ranch near Scotts Valley, California, in the Santa Cruz Mountains. Their primary residence was an English-style home in Bel Air, purchased in 1942. Hitchcock's films were diverse during this period, ranging from the romantic comedy Mr. & Mrs. Smith (1941) to the bleak film noir Shadow of a Doubt (1943).

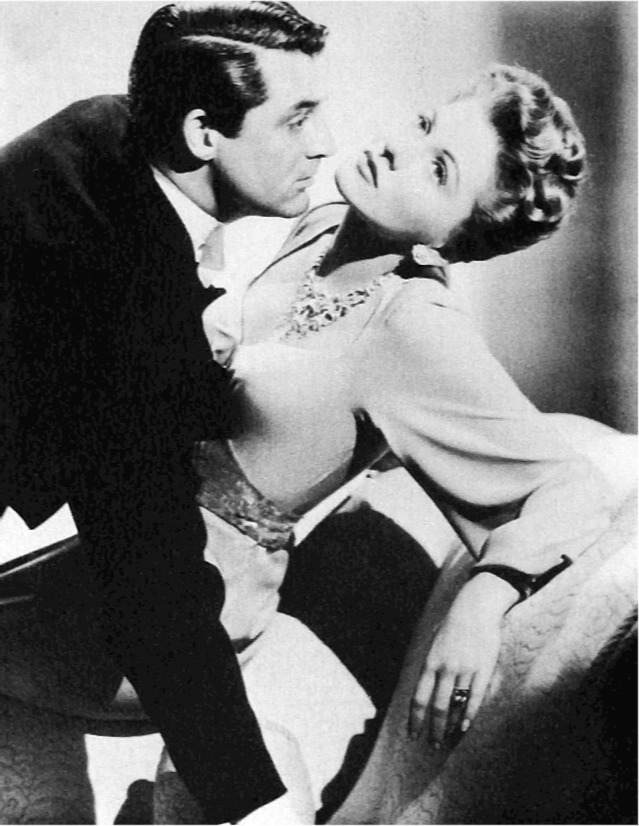
Cary Grant and Joan Fontaine in a publicity shot for Suspicion (1941)

Suspicion (1941) marked Hitchcock's first film as a producer and director. It is set in England; Hitchcock used the north coast of Santa Cruz for the English coastline sequence. The film is the first of four in which Cary Grant was cast by Hitchcock, and it is one of the rare occasions that Grant plays a sinister character. Grant plays Johnnie Aysgarth, an English conman whose actions raise suspicion and anxiety in his shy young English wife, Lina McLaidlaw (Joan Fontaine). In one scene, Hitchcock placed a light inside a glass of milk, perhaps poisoned, that Grant is bringing to his wife; the light ensures that the audience's attention is on the glass. Grant's character is actually a killer, according to the book, Before the Fact by Francis Iles, but the studio felt that Grant's image would be tarnished by that. Hitchcock would have preferred to end with the wife's murder. (Note: Hitchcock told Bryan Forbes in 1967: "They had gone through the film in my absence and taken out every scene that indicated the possibility that Cary Grant was a murderer. So there was no film existing at all. That was ridiculous. Nevertheless, I had to compromise on the end. What I wanted to do was that the wife was aware that she was going to be murdered by her husband, so she wrote a letter to her mother saying that she was very much in love with him, she didn't want live anymore, she was going to be killed but society should be protected. She therefore brings up this fatal glass of milk, drinks it and before she does she says, "Will you mail this letter to mother?" Then she drinks the milk and dies. You then have just one final scene of a cheerful Cary Grant going to the mailbox and posting the letter. ... But this was never permitted because of the basic error in casting.") Instead, the actions that she found suspicious are a reflection of his own despair and his plan to commit suicide. Fontaine won Best Actress for her performance.

Saboteur (1942) is the first of two films that Hitchcock made for Universal Studios during the decade. Hitchcock wanted Gary Cooper and Barbara Stanwyck or Henry Fonda and Gene Tierney to star, but was forced by Universal to use Universal contract player Robert Cummings and Priscilla Lane, a freelancer who signed a one-picture deal with the studio, both known for their work in comedies and light dramas. The story depicts a confrontation between a suspected saboteur (Cummings) and a real saboteur (Norman Lloyd) atop the Statue of Liberty. Hitchcock took a three-day tour of New York City to scout for Saboteur's filming locations. He also directed Have You Heard? (1942), a photographic dramatisation for Life magazine of the dangers of rumours during wartime. In 1943, he wrote a mystery story for Look, "The Murder of Monty Woolley", a sequence of captioned photographs inviting the reader to find clues to the murderer's identity; Hitchcock cast the performers as themselves, such as Woolley, Doris Merrick and make-up man Guy Pearce.

Shadow of a Doubt (1943) trailer with Joseph Cotten and Teresa Wright

Back in England, Hitchcock's mother Emma was severely ill; she died on 26 September 1942 at age 79. Hitchcock never spoke publicly about his mother, but his assistant said that he admired her. Four months later, on 4 January 1943, his brother William died of an overdose at age 52. Hitchcock was not very close to William, but his death made Hitchcock conscious about his own eating and drinking habits. He was overweight and suffering from back aches. His New Year's resolution in 1943 was to take his diet seriously with the help of a physician. In January that year, Shadow of a Doubt was released, which Hitchcock had fond memories of making. In the film, Charlotte "Charlie" Newton (Teresa Wright) suspects her beloved uncle Charlie Oakley (Joseph Cotten) of being a serial killer. Hitchcock filmed extensively on location, this time in the Northern California city of Santa Rosa.

He told Truffaut in 1962:

At the time, I was on a strenuous diet, painfully working my way from three hundred to two hundred pounds. So I decided to immortalize my loss and get my bit part by posing for "before" and "after" pictures. ... I was literally submerged by letters from fat people who wanted to know where and how they could get Reduco.

Hitchcock's typical dinner before his weight loss had been a roast chicken, boiled ham, potatoes, bread, vegetables, relishes, salad, dessert, a bottle of wine and some brandy. To lose weight, his diet consisted of black coffee for breakfast and lunch, and steak and salad for dinner, but it was hard to maintain; Donald Spoto wrote that his weight fluctuated considerably over the next 40 years. At the end of 1943, despite the weight loss, the Occidental Insurance Company of Los Angeles refused his application for life insurance.

==== Wartime non-fiction films ====
I felt the need to make a little contribution to the war effort, and I was both overweight and over-age for military service. I knew that if I did nothing, I'd regret it for the rest of my life

— Alfred Hitchcock (1967)

Hitchcock returned to the UK for an extended visit in late 1943 and early 1944. While there he made two short propaganda films, Bon Voyage (1944) and Aventure Malgache (1944), for the Ministry of Information. In June and July 1945, Hitchcock served as "treatment advisor" on a Holocaust documentary that used Allied Forces footage of the liberation of Nazi concentration camps. The film was assembled in London and produced by Sidney Bernstein of the Ministry of Information, who brought Hitchcock (a friend of his) on board. It was originally intended to be broadcast to the Germans, but the British government deemed it too traumatic to be shown to a shocked post-war population. Instead, it was transferred in 1952 from the British War Office film vaults to London's Imperial War Museum and remained unreleased until 1985, when an edited version was broadcast as an episode of PBS Frontline, under the title the Imperial War Museum had given it: Memory of the Camps. The full-length version of the film, German Concentration Camps Factual Survey, was restored in 2014 by scholars at the Imperial War Museum.

=== Post-war Hollywood years: 1945–1953 ===
==== Later Selznick films ====
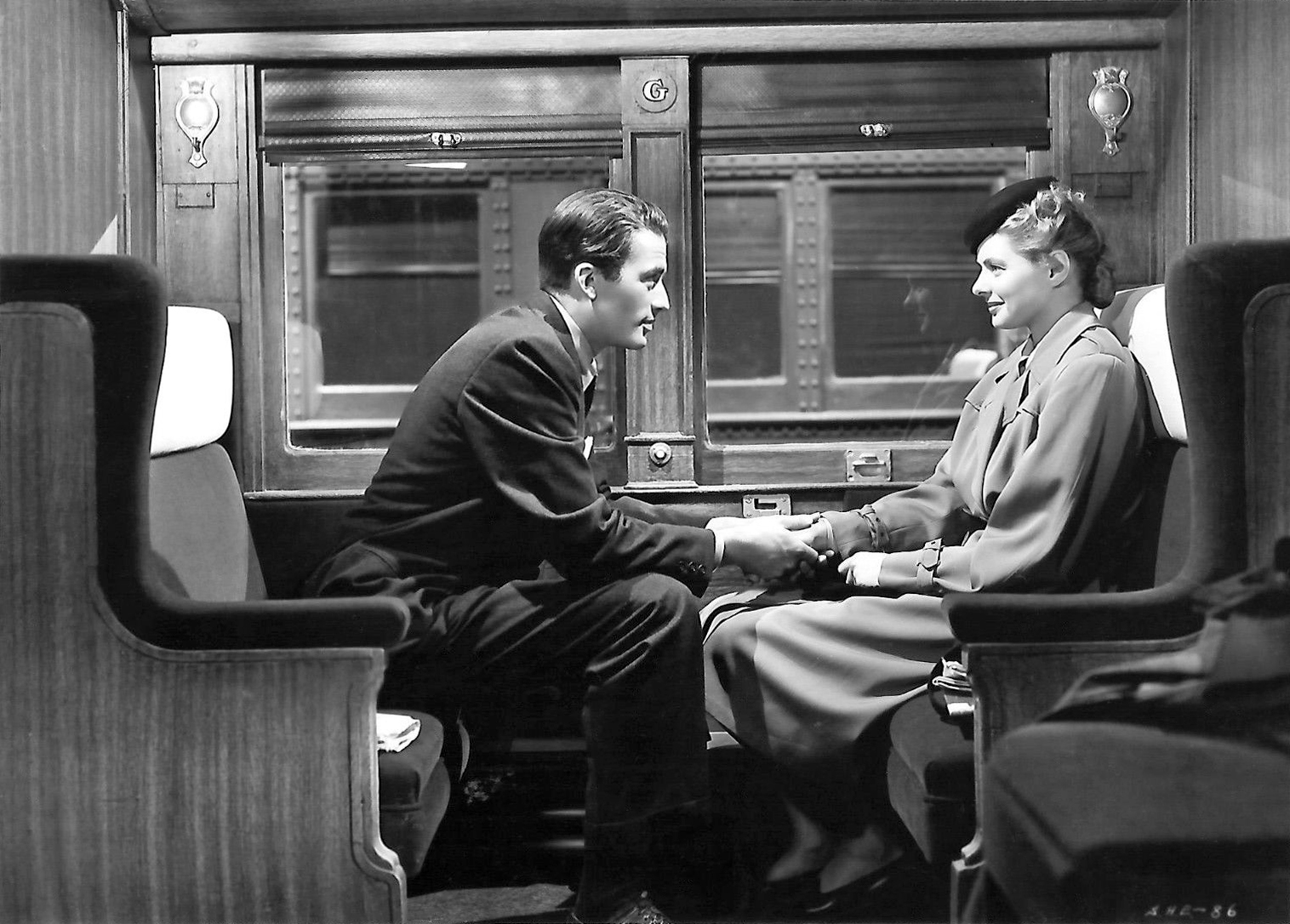
Gregory Peck and Ingrid Bergman in Spellbound (1945)

Hitchcock worked for David Selznick again when he directed Spellbound (1945), which explores psychoanalysis and features a dream sequence designed by Salvador Dalí. The dream sequence as it appears in the film is ten minutes shorter than was originally envisioned; Selznick edited it to make it "play" more effectively. Gregory Peck plays amnesiac Dr. Anthony Edwardes under the treatment of analyst Dr. Peterson (Ingrid Bergman), who falls in love with him while trying to unlock his repressed past. Two point-of-view shots were achieved by building a large wooden hand (which would appear to belong to the character whose point of view the camera took) and out-sized props for it to hold: a bucket-sized glass of milk and a large wooden gun. For added novelty and impact, the climactic gunshot was hand-coloured red on some copies of the black-and-white film. The original musical score by Miklós Rózsa makes use of the theremin, and some of it was later adapted by the composer into Rozsa's Piano Concerto Op. 31 (1967) for piano and orchestra.

The spy film Notorious followed next in 1946. Hitchcock told François Truffaut that Selznick sold him, Ingrid Bergman, Cary Grant and Ben Hecht's screenplay, to RKO Radio Pictures as a "package" for $500,000 (equivalent to $8.3 million in 2025) because of cost overruns on Selznick's Duel in the Sun (1946). Notorious stars Bergman and Grant, both Hitchcock collaborators, and features a plot about Nazis, uranium and South America. His prescient use of uranium as a plot device led to him being briefly placed under surveillance by the Federal Bureau of Investigation. According to Patrick McGilligan, in or around March 1945, Hitchcock and Hecht consulted Robert Millikan of the California Institute of Technology about the development of a uranium bomb. Selznick complained that the notion was "science fiction", only to be confronted by the news of the detonation of two atomic bombs on Hiroshima and Nagasaki in Japan in August 1945.

==== Transatlantic Pictures ====
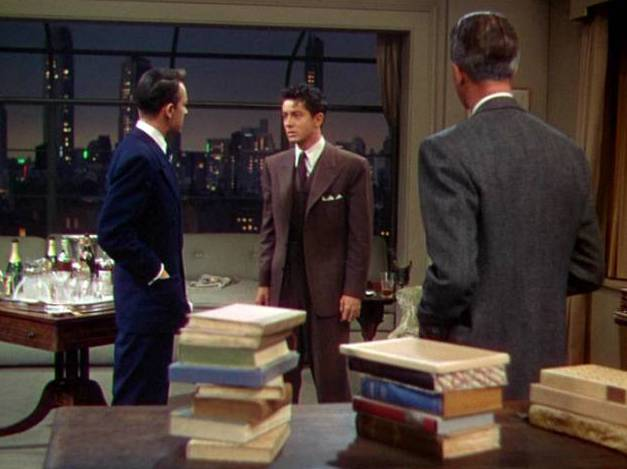
A typical shot from Rope (1948) with James Stewart turning his back to the fixed camera

Hitchcock formed an independent production company, Transatlantic Pictures, with his friend Sidney Bernstein. He made two films with Transatlantic, one of which was his first colour film. With Rope (1948), Hitchcock experimented with marshalling suspense in a confined environment, as he had done earlier with Lifeboat. The film appears as a very limited number of continuous shots, but it was actually shot in 10 ranging from 4 1/2 to 10 minutes each; a 10-minute length of film was the most that a camera's film magazine could hold at the time. Some transitions between reels were hidden by having a dark object fill the entire screen for a moment. Hitchcock used those points to hide the cut, and began the next take with the camera in the same place. The film features James Stewart in the leading role, and was the first of four films that Stewart made with Hitchcock. It was inspired by the Leopold and Loeb case that occurred in the 1920s. Critical response at the time was mixed.

Under Capricorn (1949), set in 19th-century Australia, also uses the short-lived technique of long takes, but to a more limited extent. He again used Technicolor in this production, then returned to black-and-white for several years. Transatlantic Pictures became inactive after the last two films. Hitchcock filmed Stage Fright (1950) at Elstree Studios in England, where he had worked during his British International Pictures contract many years before. He paired one of Warner Bros.' most popular stars, Jane Wyman, with the expatriate German actor Marlene Dietrich and used several prominent British actors, including Michael Wilding, Richard Todd and Alastair Sim. This was Hitchcock's first proper production for Warner Bros., which had distributed Rope and Under Capricorn, because Transatlantic Pictures was experiencing financial difficulties.

His thriller Strangers on a Train (1951) was based on the novel of the same name by Patricia Highsmith. Hitchcock combined many elements from his preceding films. He approached Dashiell Hammett to write the dialogue, but Raymond Chandler took over, then left over disagreements with the director. In the film, two men casually meet, one of whom speculates on a foolproof method to murder; he suggests that two people, each wishing to do away with someone, should each perform the other's murder. Farley Granger's role was as the innocent victim of the scheme, while Robert Walker, previously known for "boy-next-door" roles, played the villain. I Confess (1953) was set in Quebec with Montgomery Clift as a Catholic priest.

=== Peak years: 1954–1964 ===
==== Dial M for Murder and Rear Window ====
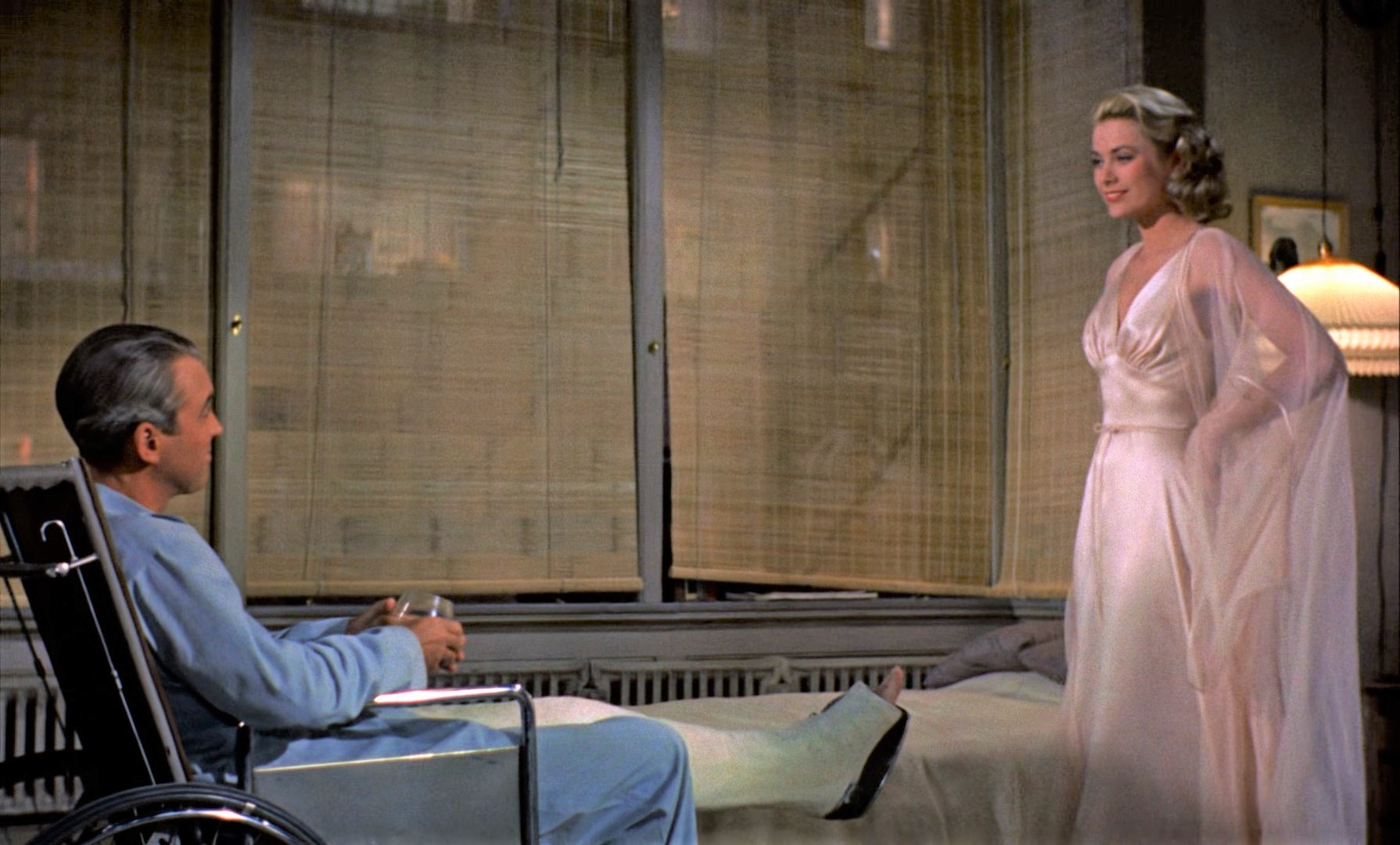
James Stewart and Grace Kelly in Rear Window (1954)

I Confess was followed by three colour films starring Grace Kelly: Dial M for Murder (1954), Rear Window (1954) and To Catch a Thief (1955). In Dial M for Murder, Ray Milland plays the villain who tries to murder his unfaithful wife (Kelly) for her money. She kills the hired assassin in self-defence, so Milland manipulates the evidence to make it look like murder. Her lover, Mark Halliday (Robert Cummings), and Police Inspector Hubbard (John Williams) save her from execution. Hitchcock experimented with 3D cinematography for Dial M for Murder.

Hitchcock moved to Paramount Pictures and filmed Rear Window (1954), starring James Stewart and Grace Kelly, as well as Thelma Ritter and Raymond Burr. Stewart's character is a photographer named Jeff (based on Robert Capa) who must temporarily use a wheelchair. Out of boredom, he begins observing his neighbours across the courtyard, then becomes convinced that one of them (Raymond Burr) has murdered his wife. Jeff eventually manages to convince his policeman buddy (Wendell Corey) and his girlfriend (Kelly). As with Lifeboat and Rope, the principal characters are depicted in confined or cramped quarters, in this case Stewart's studio apartment. Hitchcock uses close-ups of Stewart's face to show his character's reactions, "from the comic voyeurism directed at his neighbours to his helpless terror watching Kelly and Burr in the villain's apartment".

==== Alfred Hitchcock Presents ====
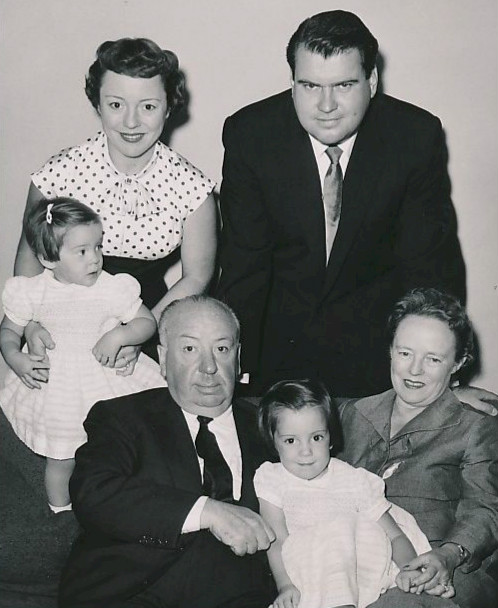
The Hitchcocks with their daughter, son-in-law, and granddaughters, c. 1955–1956

From 1955 to 1965, Hitchcock was the host of the television series Alfred Hitchcock Presents. With his droll delivery, gallows humour, and distinctive features, the series made Hitchcock a celebrity. The title-sequence of the show pictured a minimalist caricature of his profile (he drew it himself; it is composed of only nine strokes), which his real silhouette then filled. The series theme tune was Funeral March of a Marionette by the French composer Charles Gounod (1818–1893).

His introductions always included some sort of wry humour, such as the description of a recent multi-person execution hampered by having only one electric chair, while two are shown with a sign "Two chairs—no waiting!" He directed 18 episodes of the series, which aired from 1955 to 1965. It became The Alfred Hitchcock Hour in 1962, and NBC broadcast the final episode on 10 May 1965. In the 1980s, a new version of Alfred Hitchcock Presents was produced for television, making use of Hitchcock's original introductions in a colourised form.

Hitchcock's success in television spawned a set of short-story collections in his name; these included Alfred Hitchcock's Anthology, Stories They Wouldn't Let Me Do on TV, and Tales My Mother Never Told Me. In 1956, HSD Publications also licensed the director's name to create Alfred Hitchcock's Mystery Magazine, a monthly digest specialising in crime and detective fiction. Hitchcock's television series were very profitable, and his foreign-language versions of books were bringing revenues of up to $100,000 a year (equivalent to $1,090,000 in 2025).

==== From To Catch a Thief to Vertigo ====
In 1955, Hitchcock became a United States citizen. In the same year, his third Grace Kelly film, To Catch a Thief, was released; it is set in the French Riviera, and stars Kelly and Cary Grant. Grant plays retired thief John Robie, who becomes the prime suspect for a spate of robberies in the Riviera. A thrill-seeking American heiress played by Kelly surmises his true identity and tries to seduce him. "Despite the obvious age disparity between Grant and Kelly and a lightweight plot, the witty script (loaded with double entendres) and the good-natured acting proved a commercial success." It was Hitchcock's last film with Kelly; she married Prince Rainier of Monaco in 1956, and ended her film career afterward. Hitchcock then remade his own 1934 film The Man Who Knew Too Much in 1956. This time, the film starred James Stewart and Doris Day, who sang the theme song "Que Sera, Sera", which won the Academy Award for Best Original Song and became a big hit. They play a couple whose son is kidnapped to prevent them from interfering with an assassination. As in the 1934 film, the climax takes place at the Royal Albert Hall.

The Wrong Man (1956), Hitchcock's final film for Warner Bros., is a low-key black-and-white production based on a real-life case of mistaken identity reported in Life magazine in 1953. This was the only film of Hitchcock to star Henry Fonda, playing a Stork Club musician mistaken for a liquor store thief, who is arrested and tried for robbery while his wife (Vera Miles) emotionally collapses under the strain. Hitchcock told Truffaut that his lifelong fear of the police attracted him to the subject and was embedded in many scenes.

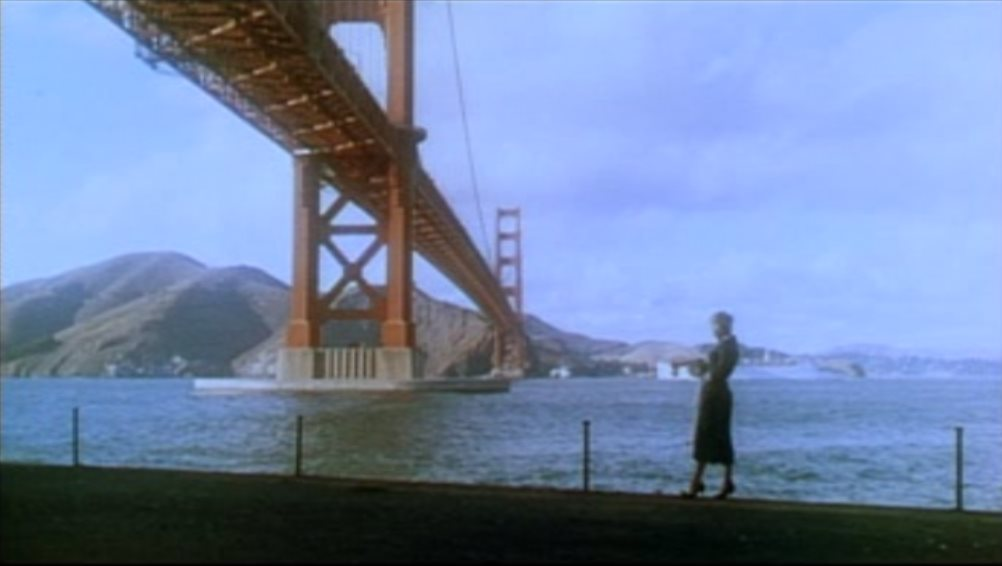
Kim Novak by the Golden Gate Bridge in Vertigo (1958) (Note: A 2012 British Film Institute poll ranked Vertigo as the greatest film ever made.)

While directing episodes for Alfred Hitchcock Presents during the summer of 1957, Hitchcock was admitted to hospital for hernia and gallstones, and had to have his gallbladder removed. Following a successful surgery, he immediately returned to work to prepare for his next project. Vertigo (1958) again starred James Stewart, with Kim Novak and Barbara Bel Geddes. He had wanted Vera Miles to play the lead, but she was pregnant. He told Oriana Fallaci: "I was offering her a big part, the chance to become a beautiful sophisticated blonde, a real actress. We'd have spent a heap of dollars on it, and she has the bad taste to get pregnant. I hate pregnant women, because then they have children."

In Vertigo, Stewart plays Scottie, a former police investigator suffering from acrophobia, who becomes obsessed with a woman he has been hired to shadow (Novak). Scottie's obsession leads to tragedy, and this time Hitchcock did not opt for a happy ending. Some critics, including Donald Spoto and Roger Ebert, agree that Vertigo is the director's most personal and revealing film, dealing with the Pygmalion-like obsessions of a man who moulds a woman into the person he desires. Vertigo explores more frankly and at greater length his interest in the relation between sex and death, than any other work in his filmography.

Vertigo contains a camera technique developed by Irmin Roberts, commonly referred to as a dolly zoom, which has been copied by many filmmakers. The film premiered at the San Sebastián International Film Festival, and Hitchcock won the Silver Seashell prize. Vertigo is considered a classic, but it attracted mixed reviews and poor box-office receipts at the time; the critic from Variety opined that the film was "too slow and too long". Bosley Crowther of the New York Times thought it was "devilishly far-fetched", but praised the cast performances and Hitchcock's direction. The picture was also the last collaboration between Stewart and Hitchcock. In the 2002 Sight & Sound polls, it ranked just behind Citizen Kane (1941); ten years later, in the same magazine, critics chose it as the best film ever made.

==== North by Northwest and Psycho ====
After Vertigo, the rest of 1958 was a difficult year for Hitchcock. During pre-production of North by Northwest (1959), which was a "slow" and "agonising" process, his wife Alma was diagnosed with cancer. While she was in hospital, Hitchcock kept himself occupied with his television work and would visit her every day. Alma underwent surgery and made a full recovery, but it caused Hitchcock to imagine, for the first time, life without her.

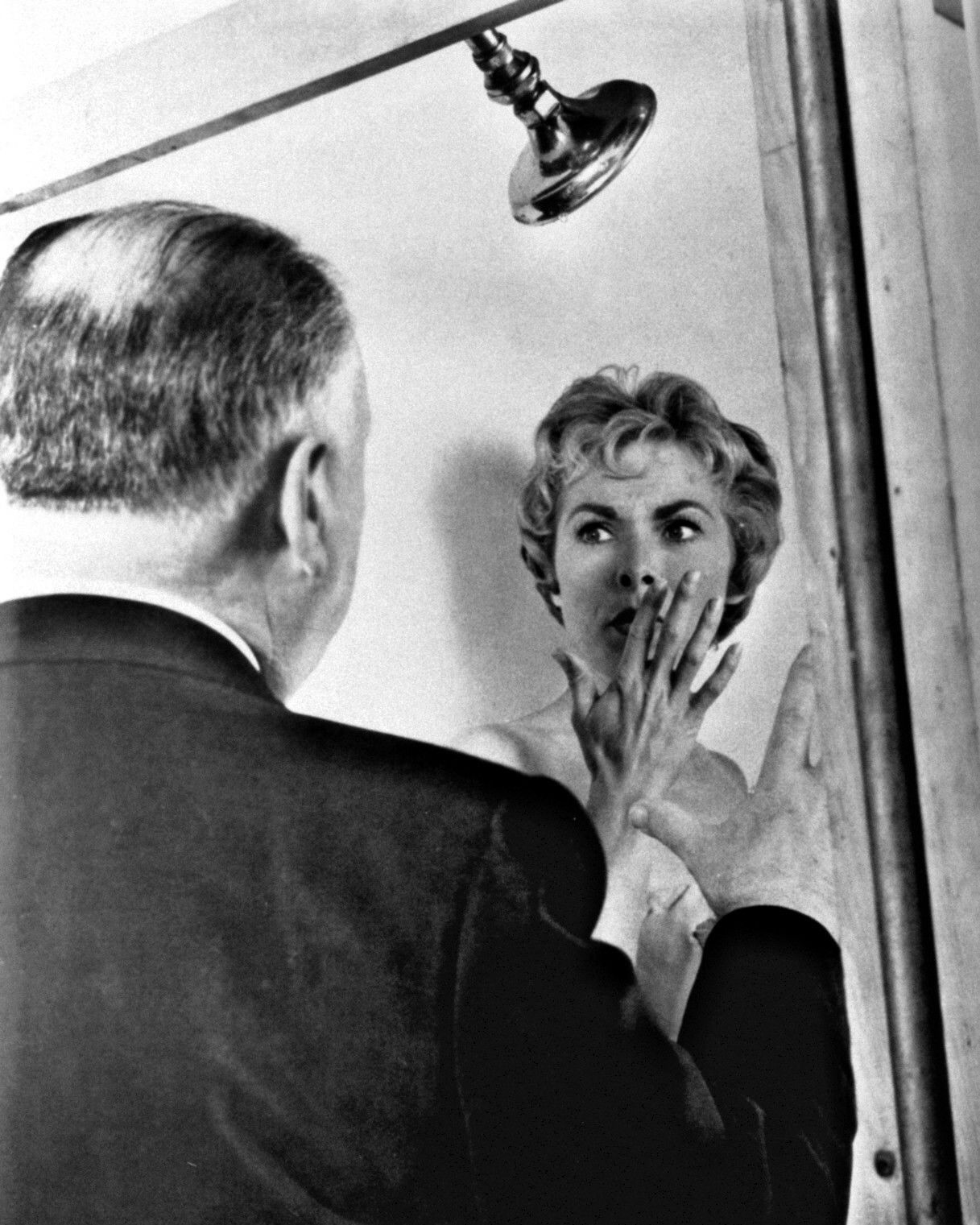
Hitchcock shooting the shower scene of Psycho (1960)

Hitchcock followed up with three more successful films, which are also recognised as among his best: North by Northwest, Psycho (1960) and The Birds (1963). In North by Northwest, Cary Grant portrays Roger Thornhill, a Madison Avenue advertising executive who is mistaken for a government secret agent. He is pursued across the United States by enemy agents, including Eve Kendall (Eva Marie Saint). At first, Thornhill believes Kendall is helping him, but then realises that she is an enemy agent; he later learns that she is working undercover for the CIA. During its opening two-week run at Radio City Music Hall, the film grossed $404,056 (equivalent to $4.5 million in 2025), setting a non-holiday gross record for that theatre. Time magazine called the film "smoothly troweled and thoroughly entertaining".

Psycho (1960) is arguably Hitchcock's best-known film. Based on Robert Bloch's 1959 novel Psycho, which was inspired by the case of Ed Gein, the film was produced on a tight budget of $800,000 (equivalent to $8.7 million in 2025) and shot in black-and-white on a spare set using crew members from Alfred Hitchcock Presents. The unprecedented violence of the shower scene, (Note: A documentary on Psycho's shower scene, 78/52, was released in 2017, directed by Alexandre O. Philippe; the title refers to the scene's 78 camera setups and 52 cuts.) the early death of the heroine, and the innocent lives extinguished by a disturbed murderer became the hallmarks of a new horror-film genre. The film proved popular with audiences, with lines stretching outside theatres as viewers waited for the next showing. It broke box-office records in the United Kingdom, France, South America, the United States and Canada, and was a moderate success in Australia for a brief period.

Psycho was the most profitable of Hitchcock's career, and he personally earned in excess of $15 million (equivalent to $160 million in 2025). He subsequently swapped his rights to Psycho and his TV anthology for 150,000 shares of MCA, making him the third largest shareholder and his own boss at Universal, in theory at least, although that did not stop studio interference. Following the first film, Psycho became an American horror franchise: Psycho II, Psycho III, Bates Motel, Psycho IV: The Beginning and a colour 1998 remake of the original.

==== Truffaut interview ====
On 13 August 1962, Hitchcock's 63rd birthday, the French director François Truffaut began a 50-hour interview of Hitchcock, filmed over eight days at Universal Studios, during which Hitchcock agreed to answer 500 questions. It took four years to transcribe the tapes and organise the images; it was published as a book in 1967, which Truffaut nicknamed the "Hitchbook". The audio tapes were used as the basis of a documentary in 2015. Truffaut sought the interview because it was clear to him that Hitchcock was not simply the mass-market entertainer the American media made him out to be. It was obvious from his films, Truffaut wrote, that Hitchcock had "given more thought to the potential of his art than any of his colleagues". He compared the interview to "Oedipus' consultation of the oracle".

==== The Birds ====
Trailer for The Birds (1963), in which Hitchcock discusses humanity's treatment of "our feathered friends"

The film scholar Peter William Evans wrote that The Birds (1963) and Marnie (1964) are regarded as "undisputed masterpieces". Hitchcock had intended to film Marnie first, and in March 1962 it was announced that Grace Kelly, Princess Grace of Monaco since 1956, would come out of retirement to star in it. When Kelly asked Hitchcock to postpone Marnie until 1963 or 1964, he recruited Evan Hunter, author of The Blackboard Jungle (1954), to develop a screenplay based on a Daphne du Maurier short story, "The Birds" (1952), which Hitchcock had republished in his My Favorites in Suspense (1959). He hired Tippi Hedren to play the lead role. It was her first role; she had been a model in New York when Hitchcock saw her, in October 1961, in an NBC television advert for Sego, a diet drink: "I signed her because she is a classic beauty. Movies don't have them any more. Grace Kelly was the last." He insisted, without explanation, that her first name be written in single quotation marks: 'Tippi'. (Note: Thomas McDonald (The New York Times, 1 April 1962): "Starring in the film are Rod Taylor, Suzanne Pleshette, Jessica Tandy and 'Tippi' Hedren. Hitchcock signed Miss Hedren, a New York model, to a contract after having seen her in a television commercial. He insisted that she enclose her first name in single quotation marks, but would not explain why.")

In The Birds, Melanie Daniels, a young socialite, meets lawyer Mitch Brenner (Rod Taylor) in a bird shop; Jessica Tandy plays his possessive mother. Hedren visits him in Bodega Bay (where The Birds was filmed) carrying a pair of lovebirds as a gift. Suddenly waves of birds start gathering, watching, and attacking. The question: "What do the birds want?" is left unanswered. Hitchcock made the film with equipment from the Revue Studio, which made Alfred Hitchcock Presents. He said it was his most technically challenging film, using a combination of trained and mechanical birds against a backdrop of wild ones. Every shot was sketched in advance.

An HBO/BBC television film, The Girl (2012), depicted Hedren's experiences on set; she said that Hitchcock became obsessed with her and sexually harassed her. He reportedly isolated her from the rest of the crew, had her followed, whispered obscenities to her, had her handwriting analysed and had a ramp built from his private office directly into her trailer. Diane Baker, her co-star in Marnie, said: "[N]othing could have been more horrible for me than to arrive on that movie set and to see her being treated the way she was." While filming the attack scene in the attic – which took a week to film – she was placed in a caged room while two men wearing elbow-length protective gloves threw live birds at her. Toward the end of the week, to stop the birds' flying away from her too soon, one leg of each bird was attached by nylon thread to elastic bands sewn inside her clothes. She broke down after a bird cut her lower eyelid, and filming was halted on doctor's orders.

==== Marnie ====
Trailer for Marnie (1964)

In June 1962, Grace Kelly announced that she had decided against appearing in Marnie (1964). Hedren had signed an exclusive seven-year, $500-a-week contract with Hitchcock in October 1961, and he decided to cast her in the lead role opposite Sean Connery. In 2016, describing Hedren's performance as "one of the greatest in the history of cinema", Richard Brody called the film a "story of sexual violence" inflicted on the character played by Hedren: "The film is, to put it simply, sick, and it's so because Hitchcock was sick. He suffered all his life from furious sexual desire, suffered from the lack of its gratification, suffered from the inability to transform fantasy into reality, and then went ahead and did so virtually, by way of his art." A 1964 New York Times review called it Hitchcock's "most disappointing film in years", citing Hedren's and Connery's lack of experience, an amateurish script and "glaringly fake cardboard backdrops".

In the film, Marnie Edgar (Hedren) steals $40,000 from her employer and goes on the run. She applies for a job at Mark Rutland's (Connery) company in Philadelphia and steals from there too. Earlier, she is shown having a panic attack during a thunderstorm and fearing the colour red. Mark tracks her down and blackmails her into marrying him. She explains that she does not want to be touched, but during the "honeymoon", Mark rapes her. Marnie and Mark discover that Marnie's mother had been a prostitute when Marnie was a child, and that, while the mother was fighting with a client during a thunderstorm – the mother believed the client had tried to molest Marnie – Marnie had killed the client to save her mother. When she remembers what happened, she decides to stay with Mark.

Hitchcock told cinematographer Robert Burks that the camera had to be placed as close as possible to Hedren when he filmed her face. Evan Hunter, the screenwriter of The Birds who was writing Marnie too, explained to Hitchcock that, if Mark loved Marnie, he would comfort her, not rape her. Hitchcock reportedly replied: "Evan, when he sticks it in her, I want that camera right on her face!" When Hunter submitted two versions of the script, one without the rape scene, Hitchcock replaced him with Jay Presson Allen.

=== Later years: 1966–1980 ===
==== Final films ====
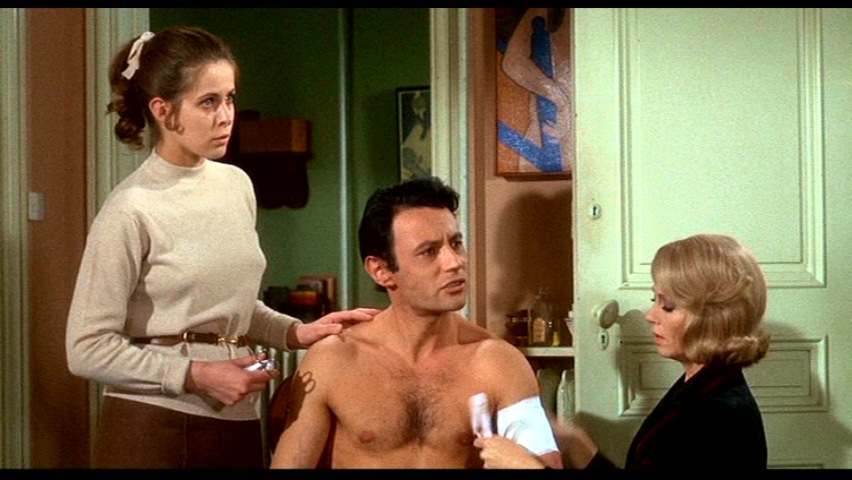
Claude Jade, Michel Subor, and Dany Robin in Alfred Hitchcocks 51st film Topaz

Failing health reduced Hitchcock's output during the last two decades of his life. Biographer Stephen Rebello claimed Universal imposed two films on him, Torn Curtain (1966) and Topaz (1969), the latter of which is based on a Leon Uris novel, partly set in Cuba. Both were spy thrillers with Cold War-related themes. Torn Curtain, with Paul Newman and Julie Andrews, precipitated the bitter end of the twelve-year collaboration between Hitchcock and composer Bernard Herrmann. Hitchcock was unhappy with Herrmann's score and replaced him with John Addison, Jay Livingston and Ray Evans. Upon release, Torn Curtain was a box office disappointment, and Topaz was disliked by both critics and the studio. Hitchcock had now engaged for Topaz an international ensemble of European stars, including Frederick Stafford as the agent, the french actresses Dany Robin and Claude Jade as his blonde wife and daughter, french actors Michel Piccoli, Philippe Noiret, Michel Subor and the german actress Karin Dor. Co-author Leon Uris was replaced by Samuel Taylor, and Hitchcock shot three different endings. The director's cut was not released until 1999.

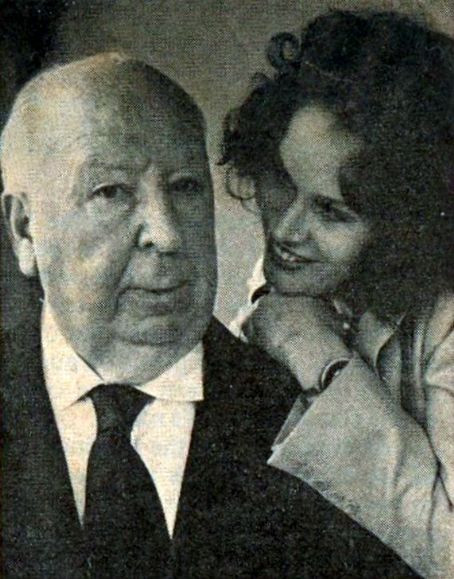
Hitchcock with Karen Black during a press junket for Family Plot (1976)

Hitchcock returned to Britain to make his penultimate film, Frenzy (1972), based on the novel Goodbye Piccadilly, Farewell Leicester Square (1966). After two espionage films, the plot marked a return to the murder-thriller genre. Richard Blaney (Jon Finch), a volatile barman with a history of explosive anger, becomes the prime suspect in the investigation into the "Necktie Murders", which are actually committed by his friend Bob Rusk (Barry Foster). This time, Hitchcock makes the victim and villain kindreds, rather than opposites, as in Strangers on a Train.

In Frenzy, Hitchcock allowed nudity for the first time. Two scenes show naked women, one of whom is being raped and strangled; Donald Spoto called the latter "one of the most repellent examples of a detailed murder in the history of film". Both actors, Barbara Leigh-Hunt and Anna Massey, refused to do the scenes, so models were used instead. Biographers have noted that Hitchcock had always pushed the limits of film censorship, often managing to fool Joseph Breen, the head of the Motion Picture Production Code. Hitchcock would add subtle hints of improprieties forbidden by censorship until the mid-1960s. Yet, Patrick McGilligan wrote that Breen and others often realised that Hitchcock was inserting such material and were actually amused, as well as alarmed by Hitchcock's "inescapable inferences".

Family Plot (1976) was Hitchcock's last film. It relates the escapades of "Madam" Blanche Tyler, played by Barbara Harris, a fraudulent spiritualist, and her taxi-driver lover Bruce Dern, making a living from her phony powers. While Family Plot was based on the Victor Canning novel The Rainbird Pattern (1972), the novel's tone is more sinister. Screenwriter Ernest Lehman originally wrote the film, under the working title Deception, with a dark tone but was pushed to a lighter, more comical tone by Hitchcock where it took the name Deceit, then finally, Family Plot.

==== Knighthood and death ====
Toward the end of his life, Hitchcock was working on the script for a spy thriller, The Short Night, collaborating with James Costigan, Ernest Lehman and David Freeman. Despite preliminary work, it was never filmed. Hitchcock's health was declining and he was worried about his wife, who had suffered a stroke. The screenplay was eventually published in Freeman's book The Last Days of Alfred Hitchcock (1999).

Having refused a CBE in 1962, Hitchcock was appointed a Knight Commander of the Most Excellent Order of the British Empire (KBE) in the 1980 New Year Honours. He was too ill to travel to London—he had a pacemaker and was being given cortisone injections for his arthritis—so on 3 January 1980 the British consul general presented him with the papers at Universal Studios. Asked by a reporter after the ceremony why it had taken the Queen so long, Hitchcock quipped, "I suppose it was a matter of carelessness." Cary Grant, Janet Leigh and others attended a luncheon afterwards.

His last public appearance was on 16 March 1980, when he introduced the next year's winner of the American Film Institute award. He died of kidney failure the following month, on 29 April, at his Bel Air home. Donald Spoto, one of Hitchcock's biographers, wrote that Hitchcock had declined to see a priest, but according to Jesuit priest Mark Henninger, he and another priest, Tom Sullivan, celebrated Mass at the filmmaker's home, and Sullivan heard his confession. Hitchcock was survived by his wife and daughter. His funeral was held at Good Shepherd Catholic Church in Beverly Hills on 30 April, after which his body was cremated. His remains were scattered over the Pacific Ocean on 10 May.

== Filmmaking ==
=== Style and themes ===
The "Hitchcockian" style includes the use of editing and camera movement to mimic a person's gaze, thereby turning viewers into voyeurs, and framing shots to maximise anxiety and fear. The film critic Robin Wood wrote that the meaning of a Hitchcock film "is there in the method, in the progression from shot to shot. A Hitchcock film is an organism, with the whole implied in every detail and every detail related to the whole." Critics have traced the recurrence of guilt, confession and transferred blame in his films to Hitchcock's Catholic background and Jesuit schooling.

Hitchcock's film production career evolved from small-scale silent films to financially significant sound films. Hitchcock remarked that he was influenced by early filmmakers Georges Méliès, D. W. Griffith and Alice Guy-Blaché. His silent films between 1925 and 1929 were in the crime and suspense genres, but also included melodramas and comedies. Whilst visual storytelling was pertinent during the silent era, even after the arrival of sound, Hitchcock still relied on visuals in cinema; he referred to this emphasis on visual storytelling as "pure cinema". In Britain, he honed his craft so that by the time he moved to Hollywood, the director had perfected his style and camera techniques. Hitchcock later said that his British work was the "sensation of cinema", whereas the American phase was when his "ideas were fertilised". Scholar Robin Wood writes that the director's first two films, The Pleasure Garden and The Mountain Eagle, were influenced by German Expressionism. Afterward, he discovered Soviet cinema, and Sergei Eisenstein's and Vsevolod Pudovkin's theories of montage. 1926's The Lodger was inspired by both German and Soviet aesthetics, styles which solidified the rest of his career. Although Hitchcock's work in the 1920s found some success, several British reviewers criticised Hitchcock's films for being unoriginal and conceited. Raymond Durgnat opined that Hitchcock's films were carefully and intelligently constructed, but thought they can be shallow and rarely present a "coherent worldview".

Earning the title "Master of Suspense", the director experimented with ways to generate tension in his work. He said:

My suspense work comes out of creating nightmares for the audience. And I play with an audience. I make them gasp and surprise them and shock them. When you have a nightmare, it's awfully vivid if you're dreaming that you're being led to the electric chair. Then you're as happy as can be when you wake up because you're relieved.

During filming of North by Northwest, Hitchcock explained his reasons for recreating the set of Mount Rushmore: "The audience responds in proportion to how realistic you make it. One of the dramatic reasons for this type of photography is to get it looking so natural that the audience gets involved and believes, for the time being, what's going on up there on the screen." In a 1963 interview with Italian journalist Oriana Fallaci, Hitchcock was asked how in spite of appearing to be a pleasant, innocuous man, he seemed to enjoy making films involving suspense and terrifying crime. He responded:

I'm English. The English use a lot of imagination with their crimes. I don't get such a kick out of anything as much as out of imagining a crime. When I'm writing a story and I come to a crime, I think happily: now wouldn't it be nice to have him die like this? And then, even more happily, I think: at this point people will start yelling. It must be because I spent three years studying with the Jesuits. They used to terrify me to death, with everything, and now I'm getting my own back by terrifying other people.

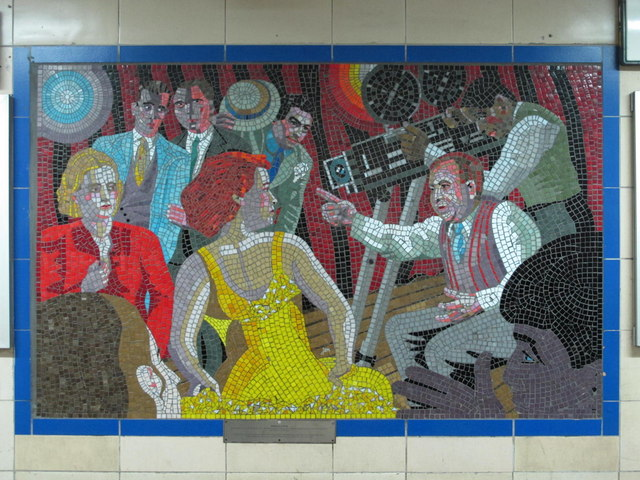
Hitchcock The Director mosaic in the London Underground

Hitchcock's films, from the silent to the sound era, contained a number of recurring themes that he is famous for. His films explored the audience as voyeurs, notably in Rear Window, Marnie and Psycho. He understood that human beings enjoy voyeuristic activities and made the audience participate in it through the character's actions. Of his fifty-three films, eleven revolved around stories of mistaken identity, where an innocent protagonist is accused of a crime and is pursued by police. In most cases, it is an ordinary, everyday person who finds themselves in a dangerous situation. Hitchcock told Truffaut: "That's because the theme of the innocent man being accused, I feel, provides the audience with a greater sense of danger. It's easier for them to identify with him than with a guilty man on the run." One of his constant themes was the struggle of a personality torn between "order and chaos"; known as the notion of "double", which is a comparison or contrast between two characters or objects: the double representing a dark or evil side.

According to Robin Wood, Hitchcock retained a feeling of ambivalence towards homosexuality, despite working with gay actors throughout his career. Donald Spoto suggests that Hitchcock's sexually repressive childhood may have contributed to his exploration of deviancy. During the 1950s, the Motion Picture Production Code prohibited direct references to homosexuality but the director was known for his subtle references, and pushing the boundaries of the censors. Moreover, Shadow of a Doubt has a double incest theme through the storyline, expressed implicitly through images. Author Jane Sloan argues that Hitchcock was drawn to both conventional and unconventional sexual expression in his work, and the theme of marriage was usually presented in a "bleak and skeptical" manner. It was also not until after his mother's death in 1942, that Hitchcock portrayed motherly figures as "notorious monster-mothers". The espionage backdrop, and murders committed by characters with psychopathic tendencies were common themes too. In Hitchcock's depiction of villains and murderers, they were usually charming and friendly, forcing viewers to identify with them. The director's strict childhood and Jesuit education may have led to his distrust of authority figures such as policemen and politicians; a theme which he has explored. Also, he often employed the "MacGuffin": an object essential to the plot but insignificant in itself.

Hitchcock appeared briefly in most of his own films. For example, he is seen struggling to get a double bass onto a train (Strangers on a Train), walking dogs out of a pet shop (The Birds), fixing a neighbour's clock (Rear Window), as a shadow (Family Plot), sitting at a table in a photograph (Dial M for Murder), and riding a bus (North by Northwest, To Catch a Thief).

=== Representation of women ===
Hitchcock's portrayal of women has been the subject of much scholarly debate. Bidisha wrote in The Guardian in 2010: "There's the vamp, the tramp, the snitch, the witch, the slink, the double-crosser and, best of all, the demon mommy. Don't worry, they all get punished in the end." In a widely cited essay in 1975, Laura Mulvey introduced the idea of the male gaze; the view of the spectator in Hitchcock's films, she argued, is that of the heterosexual male protagonist. "The female characters in his films reflected the same qualities over and over again", Roger Ebert wrote in 1996: "They were blonde. They were icy and remote. They were imprisoned in costumes that subtly combined fashion with fetishism. They mesmerised the men, who often had physical or psychological handicaps. Sooner or later, every Hitchcock woman was humiliated." (Note: In 1967, Hitchcock told Truffaut: "I think the most interesting women, sexually, are the English women. I feel that the English women, the Swedes, the northern Germans, and Scandinavians are a great deal more exciting than the Latin, the Italian, and the French women. Sex should not be advertised. An English girl, looking like a schoolteacher, is apt to get into a cab with you and, to your surprise, she'll probably pull a man's pants open. ... [W]ithout the element of surprise the scenes become meaningless. There's no possibility to discover sex.")

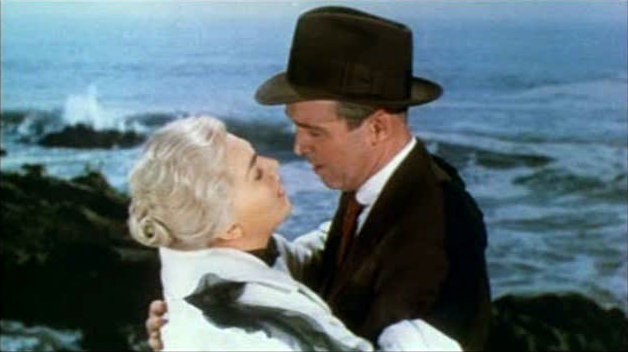
Kim Novak and James Stewart in Vertigo (1958)

Hitchcock's films often feature characters struggling in their relationships with their mothers, such as Norman Bates in Psycho. In North by Northwest, Roger Thornhill (Cary Grant) is an innocent man ridiculed by his mother for insisting that shadowy, murderous men are after him. In The Birds, the Rod Taylor character, an innocent man, finds his world under attack by vicious birds, and struggles to free himself from a clinging mother (Jessica Tandy). The killer in Frenzy has a loathing of women but idolises his mother. The villain Bruno in Strangers on a Train hates his father, but has an incredibly close relationship with his mother (played by Marion Lorne). Sebastian (Claude Rains) in Notorious has a clearly conflicting relationship with his mother, who is (rightly) suspicious of his new bride, Alicia Huberman (Ingrid Bergman).

=== Relationship with actors ===
I told her that my idea of a good actor or good actress is someone who can do nothing very well. ... I said, "That's one of the things you've got to learn to have ... authority." Out of authority comes control and out of control you get the range ... Whether you do little acting, a lot of acting in a given scene. You know exactly where you're going. And these were the first things that she had to know. Emotion comes later and the control of the voice comes later. But, within herself, she had to learn authority first and foremost because out of authority comes timing.

— Alfred Hitchcock (1967)

Hitchcock became known for having remarked that "actors should be treated like cattle". (Note: Hitchcock told Fallaci in 1963: "When they [actors] aren't cows, they're children: that's something else I've often said. And everyone knows that there are good children, bad children, and stupid children. The majority of actors, though, are stupid children. They're always quarreling, and they give themselves a lot of airs. The less I see of them, the happier I am. I had much less trouble directing fifteen hundred crows than one single actor. I've always said that Walt Disney has the right idea. His actors are made of paper; when he doesn't like them, he can tear them up.") During the filming of Mr. & Mrs. Smith (1941), Carole Lombard brought three cows onto the set wearing the name tags of Lombard, Robert Montgomery, and Gene Raymond, the stars of the film, to surprise him. In an episode of The Dick Cavett Show, originally broadcast on 8 June 1972, Dick Cavett stated as fact that Hitchcock had once called actors cattle. Hitchcock responded by saying that, at one time, he had been accused of calling actors cattle. "I said that I would never say such an unfeeling, rude thing about actors at all. What I probably said, was that all actors should be treated like cattle...In a nice way of course." He then described Carole Lombard's joke, with a smile.

Hitchcock believed that actors should concentrate on their performances and leave work on script and character to the directors and screenwriters. He told Bryan Forbes in 1967: "I remember discussing with a method actor how he was taught and so forth. He said, 'We're taught using improvisation. We are given an idea and then we are turned loose to develop in any way we want to.' I said, 'That's not acting. That's writing.'"

Recalling their experiences on Lifeboat for Charles Chandler, author of It's Only a Movie: Alfred Hitchcock A Personal Biography, Walter Slezak said that Hitchcock "knew more about how to help an actor than any director I ever worked with", and Hume Cronyn dismissed the idea that Hitchcock was not concerned with his actors as "utterly fallacious", describing at length the process of rehearsing and filming Lifeboat.

Critics observed that, despite his reputation as a man who disliked actors, actors who worked with him often gave brilliant performances. He used the same actors in many of his films; Cary Grant and James Stewart both worked with Hitchcock four times, and Ingrid Bergman and Grace Kelly three. James Mason said that Hitchcock regarded actors as "animated props". For Hitchcock, the actors were part of the film's setting. He told François Truffaut: "The chief requisite for an actor is the ability to do nothing well, which is by no means as easy as it sounds. He should be willing to be used and wholly integrated into the picture by the director and the camera. He must allow the camera to determine the proper emphasis and the most effective dramatic highlights."

=== Writing, storyboards and production ===
Hitchcock planned his scripts in detail with his writers. In Writing with Hitchcock (2001), Steven DeRosa noted that Hitchcock supervised them through every draft, asking that they tell the story visually. Hitchcock told Roger Ebert in 1969:

Once the screenplay is finished, I'd just as soon not make the film at all. All the fun is over. I have a strongly visual mind. I visualize a picture right down to the final cuts. I write all this out in the greatest detail in the script, and then I don't look at the script while I'm shooting. I know it off by heart, just as an orchestra conductor needs not look at the score. It's melancholy to shoot a picture. When you finish the script, the film is perfect. But in shooting it you lose perhaps 40 per cent of your original conception.

Hitchcock's films were extensively storyboarded to the finest detail. He was reported to have never even bothered looking through the viewfinder, since he did not need to, although in publicity photos he was shown doing so. He also used this as an excuse to never have to change his films from his initial vision. If a studio asked him to change a film, he would claim that it was already shot in a single way, and that there were no alternative takes to consider.

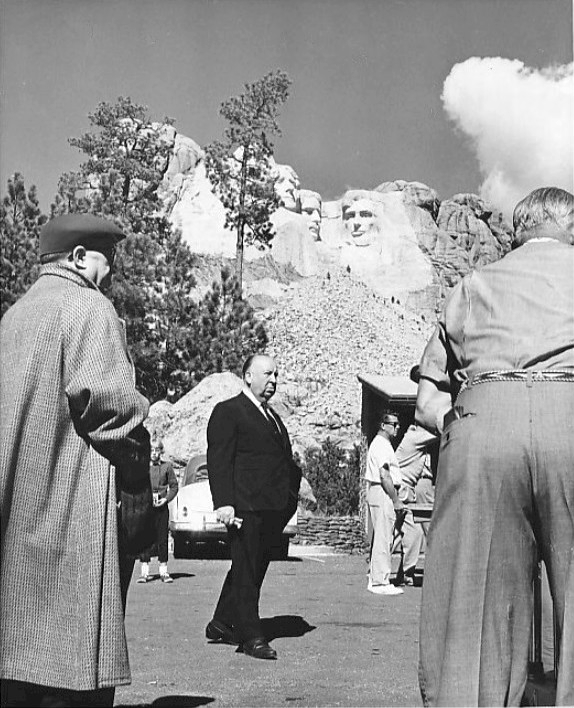
Hitchcock at Mount Rushmore filming North by Northwest (1959)

This view of Hitchcock as a director who relied more on pre-production than on the actual production itself has been challenged by Bill Krohn, the American correspondent of French film magazine Cahiers du Cinéma, in his book Hitchcock at Work. After investigating script revisions, notes to other production personnel written by or to Hitchcock, and other production material, Krohn observed that Hitchcock's work often deviated from how the screenplay was written or how the film was originally envisioned. He noted that the myth of storyboards in relation to Hitchcock, often regurgitated by generations of commentators on his films, was to a great degree perpetuated by Hitchcock himself or the publicity arm of the studios. For example, the celebrated crop-spraying sequence of North by Northwest was not storyboarded at all. After the scene was filmed, the publicity department asked Hitchcock to make storyboards to promote the film, and Hitchcock in turn hired an artist to match the scenes in detail.

Even when storyboards were made, scenes that were shot differed from them significantly. Krohn's analysis of the production of Hitchcock classics like Notorious reveals that Hitchcock was flexible enough to change a film's conception during its production. Another example Krohn notes is the American remake of The Man Who Knew Too Much, whose shooting schedule commenced without a finished script and moreover went over schedule, something that, as Krohn notes, was not an uncommon occurrence on many of Hitchcock's films, including Strangers on a Train and Topaz. While Hitchcock did do a great deal of preparation for all his films, he was fully cognisant that the actual film-making process often deviated from the best-laid plans and was flexible to adapt to the changes and needs of production as his films were not free from the normal hassles faced and common routines used during many other film productions.

Hitchcock interview, c. 1966

Krohn's work also sheds light on Hitchcock's practice of generally shooting in chronological order, which he notes sent many films over budget and over schedule and, more importantly, differed from the standard operating procedure of Hollywood in the studio system era. Equally important is Hitchcock's tendency to shoot alternative takes of scenes. This differed from coverage in that the films were not necessarily shot from varying angles so as to give the editor options to shape the film how they chose (often under the producer's aegis). Rather they represented Hitchcock's tendency to give himself options in the editing room, where he would provide advice to his editors after viewing a rough cut of the work.

According to Krohn, this and a great deal of other information revealed through his research of Hitchcock's personal papers, script revisions and the like refute the notion of Hitchcock as a director who was always in control of his films, whose vision of his films did not change during production, which Krohn notes has remained the central long-standing myth of Alfred Hitchcock. Both his fastidiousness and attention to detail also found their way into each film poster for his films. Hitchcock preferred to work with the best talent of his day—film poster designers such as Bill Gold and Saul Bass—who would produce posters that accurately represented his films.

== Legacy ==
=== Awards and honours ===
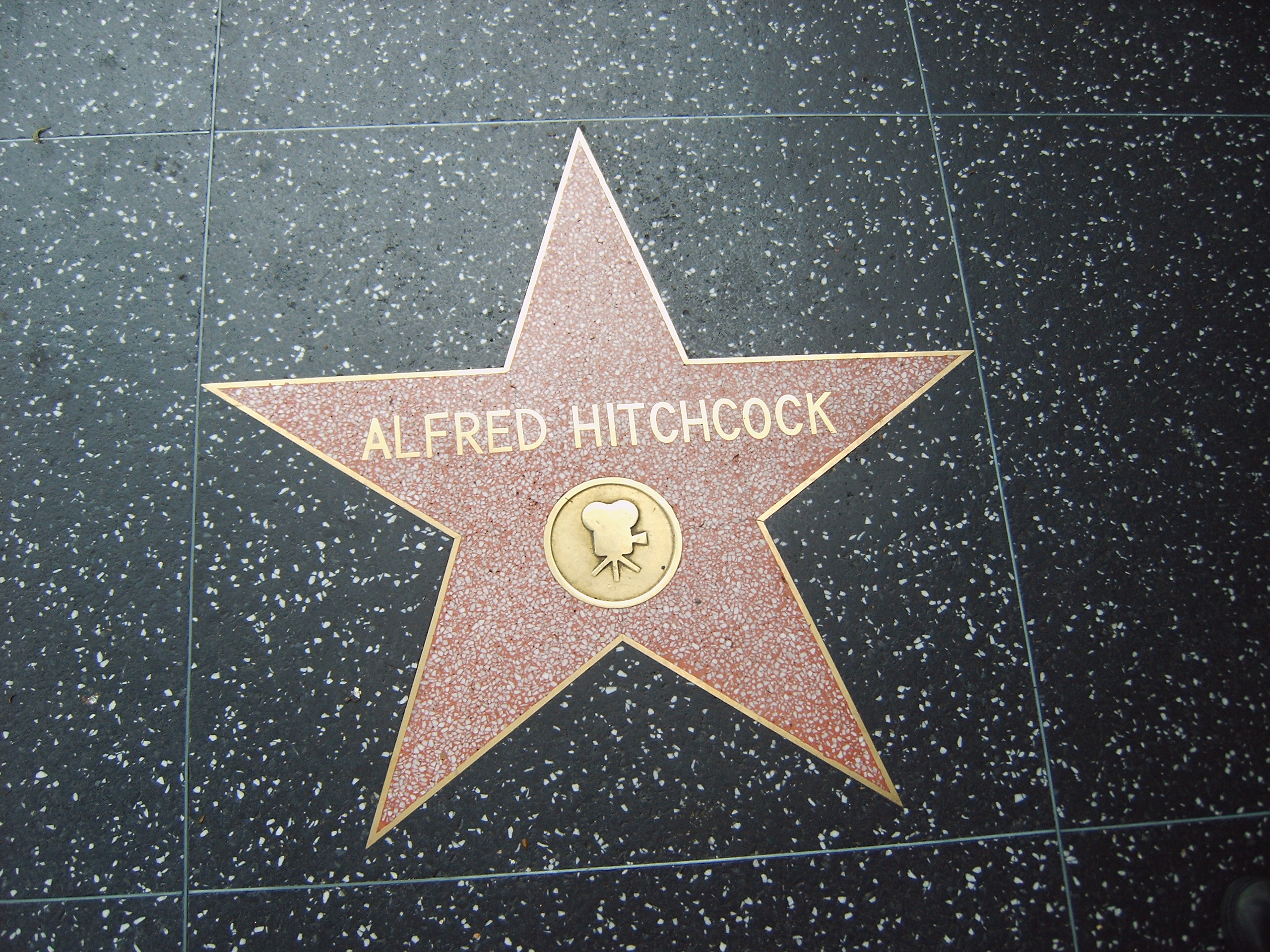
One of Hitchcock's stars on the Hollywood Walk of Fame

Hitchcock was inducted into the Hollywood Walk of Fame on 8 February 1960 with two stars: one for television and a second for motion pictures. In 1978, John Russell Taylor described him as "the most universally recognizable person in the world" and "a straightforward middle-class Englishman who just happened to be an artistic genius". In 2002, MovieMaker named him the most influential director of all time, and a 2007 The Daily Telegraph critics' poll ranked him Britain's greatest director. David Gritten, the newspaper's film critic, wrote: "Unquestionably the greatest filmmaker to emerge from these islands, Hitchcock did more than any director to shape modern cinema, which would be utterly different without him. His flair was for narrative, cruelly withholding crucial information (from his characters and from us) and engaging the emotions of the audience like no one else." In 1992, the Sight & Sound Critics' Poll ranked Hitchcock at No. 4 in its list of "Top 10 Directors" of all time. In 2002, Hitchcock was ranked second in the critics' top ten poll and fifth in the directors' top ten poll in the list of "The Greatest Directors of All Time" compiled by Sight & Sound. Hitchcock was voted the "Greatest Director of 20th Century" in a poll conducted by Japanese film magazine kinema Junpo. In 1996, Entertainment Weekly ranked Hitchcock at No. 1 in its "50 Greatest Directors" list. Hitchcock was ranked at No. 2 on Empire's "Top 40 Greatest Directors of All-Time" list in 2005. In 2007, Total Film ranked Hitchcock at No. 1 on its "100 Greatest Film Directors Ever" list.

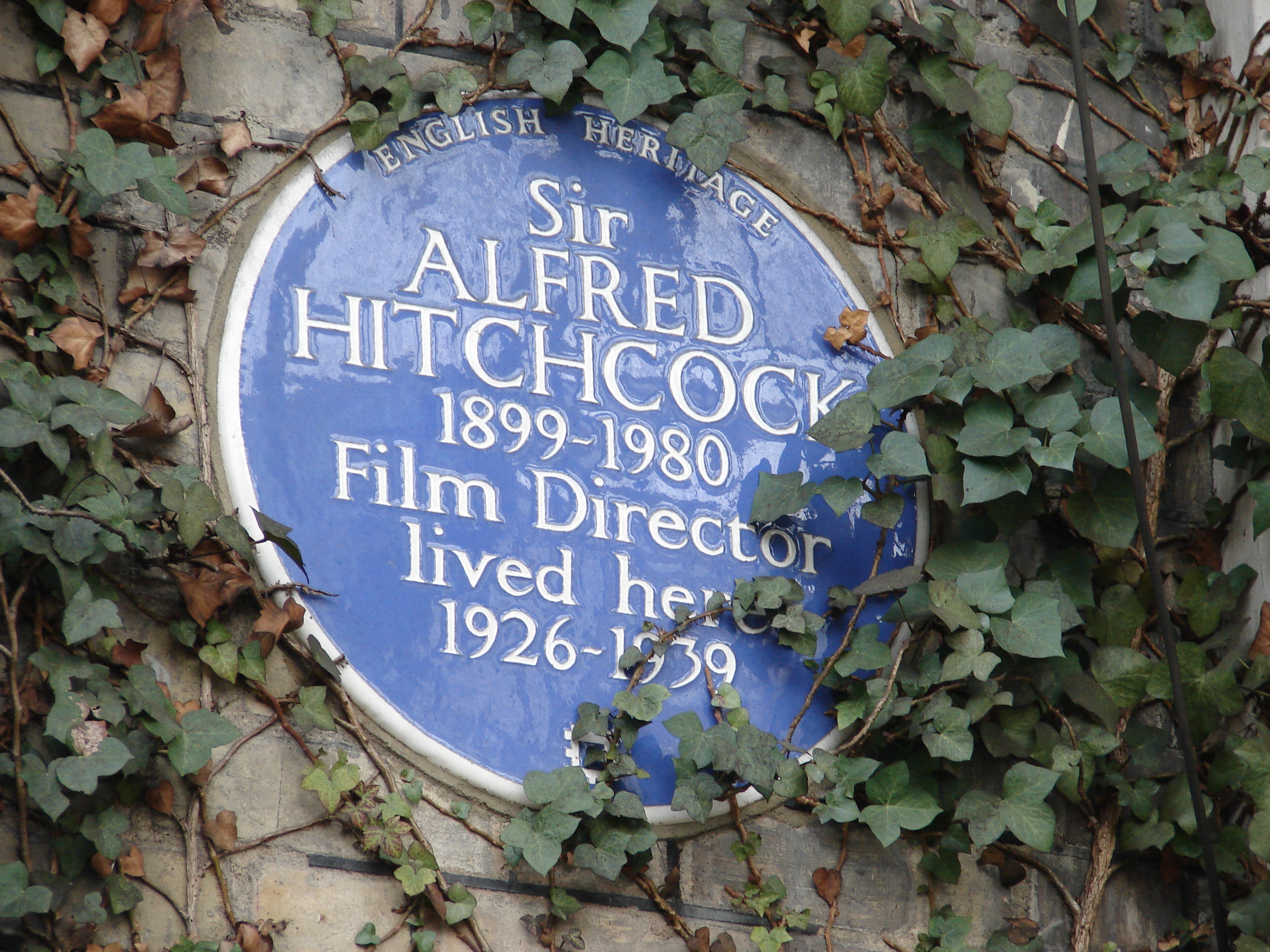
An English Heritage blue plaque marks where Hitchcock lived at 153 Cromwell Road, Kensington, London.

He won two Golden Globes, eight Laurel Awards, and five lifetime achievement awards, including the first BAFTA Academy Fellowship Award in 1971, and, in 1979, an AFI Life Achievement Award. He was nominated five times for an Academy Award for Best Director. Rebecca, nominated for eleven Oscars, won the Academy Award for Best Picture of 1940; another Hitchcock film, Foreign Correspondent, was also nominated that year. By 2021, nine of his films had been selected for preservation by the US National Film Registry: Rebecca (1940; inducted 2018), Shadow of a Doubt (1943; inducted 1991), Notorious (1946; inducted 2006), Strangers on a Train (1951; inducted 2021), Rear Window (1954; inducted 1997), Vertigo (1958; inducted 1989), North by Northwest (1959; inducted 1995), Psycho (1960; inducted 1992) and The Birds (1963; inducted 2016). In June 1968, Hitchcock was awarded an honorary Doctor of Fine Arts at the Quarry Amphitheater by the University of California, Santa Cruz.

In 2001, a series of 17 mosaics of Hitchcock's life and work, which are located in Leytonstone tube station in the London Underground, was commissioned by the London Borough of Waltham Forest. In 2012, Hitchcock was selected by artist Sir Peter Blake, author of the Beatles' Sgt. Pepper's Lonely Hearts Club Band album cover, to appear in a new version of the cover, along with other British cultural figures, and he was featured that year in a BBC Radio 4 series, The New Elizabethans, as someone "whose actions during the reign of Elizabeth II have had a significant impact on lives in these islands and given the age its character". In June 2013 nine restored versions of Hitchcock's early silent films, including The Pleasure Garden (1925), were shown at the Brooklyn Academy of Music's Harvey Theatre; known as "The Hitchcock 9", the travelling tribute was organised by the British Film Institute.

Accolades received by Hitchcock's feature films
Year	Feature Picture	Oscars		BAFTAs		Golden Globes	
Year	Feature Picture	Nominations	Wins	Nominations	Wins	Nominations	Wins
1940	Rebecca	11	2				
1940	Foreign Correspondent	6					
1941	Suspicion	3	1				
1943	Shadow of a Doubt	1					
1944	Lifeboat	3					
1945	Spellbound	6	1				
1946	Notorious	2					
1947	The Paradine Case	1					
1951	Strangers on a Train	1					
1954	Dial M for Murder			1			
1954	Rear Window	4		1			
1955	To Catch a Thief	3	1				
1955	The Trouble with Harry			2		1	1
1956	The Man Who Knew Too Much	1	1				
1958	Vertigo	2					
1959	North by Northwest	3					
1960	Psycho	4				1	1
1963	The Birds	1				1	1
1972	Frenzy					4	
1976	Family Plot					1	
Total		52	6	4		8	3

=== Archives ===
The Alfred Hitchcock Collection is housed at the Academy Film Archive in Hollywood, California. It includes home movies, 16mm film shot on the set of Blackmail (1929) and Frenzy (1972), and the earliest known colour footage of Hitchcock. The Academy Film Archive has preserved many of his home movies. In 1984, Pat Hitchcock donated her father's papers to the academy's Margaret Herrick Library. The David O. Selznick and the Ernest Lehman collections housed at the Harry Ransom Humanities Research Center in Austin, Texas, contain material related to Hitchcock's work on the production of The Paradine Case, Rebecca, Spellbound, North by Northwest and Family Plot.

=== Hitchcock portrayals ===
==== Film and Television ====
- Anthony Hopkins in Hitchcock (2012), about the making of Psycho.
- Toby Jones in The Girl (2012), about his relationship with Tippi Hedren.
- Roger Ashton-Griffiths in Grace of Monaco (2014), about Grace Kelly.
- Ian McNeice in Archie (2023), about Cary Grant.
- Tom Hollander in Monster: The Ed Gein Story (2024).

==== Radio ====
- Clive Swift in Strangers on a Film (2016), about his relationship with Raymond Chandler.
- Toby Jones in Benny & Hitch (2024), about his relationship with Bernard Herrmann.
- Jeremy Swift in The Film (2025), about his relationship with Sidney Bernstein and the making of the German Concentration Camps Factual Survey.

==== Online ====
- EpicLLOYD in the YouTube comedy series Epic Rap Battles of History (2014)

== Filmography ==
=== Films ===
Silent films
- Number 13 (1922, unfinished and lost)
- Always Tell Your Wife (1923 short, partially lost)
- The Pleasure Garden (1925)
- The Mountain Eagle (1926, lost)
- The Lodger: A Story of the London Fog (1927)
- The Ring (1927)
- Downhill (1927)
- The Farmer's Wife (1928)
- Easy Virtue (1928)
- Champagne (1928)
- The Manxman (1929)

Sound films

- Blackmail (1929)
- An Elastic Affair (1930 short, lost)
- Juno and the Paycock (1930)
- Murder! (1930)
- Elstree Calling (1930)
- The Skin Game (1931)
- Mary (1931)
- Rich and Strange (1931)
- Number Seventeen (1932)
- Waltzes from Vienna (1934)
- The Man Who Knew Too Much (1934)
- The 39 Steps (1935)
- Secret Agent (1936)
- Sabotage (1936)
- Young and Innocent (1937)
- The Lady Vanishes (1938)
- Jamaica Inn (1939)
- Rebecca (1940)
- Foreign Correspondent (1940)
- Mr. & Mrs. Smith (1941)
- Suspicion (1941)
- Saboteur (1942)
- Shadow of a Doubt (1943)
- Lifeboat (1944)
- Spellbound (1945)
- Notorious (1946)
- The Paradine Case (1947)
- Rope (1948)
- Under Capricorn (1949)
- Stage Fright (1950)
- Strangers on a Train (1951)
- I Confess (1953)
- Dial M for Murder (1954)
- Rear Window (1954)
- To Catch a Thief (1955)
- The Trouble with Harry (1955)
- The Man Who Knew Too Much (1956)
- The Wrong Man (1956)
- Vertigo (1958)
- North by Northwest (1959)
- Psycho (1960)
- The Birds (1963)
- Marnie (1964)
- Torn Curtain (1966)
- Topaz (1969)
- Frenzy (1972)
- Family Plot (1976)

== See also ==
- Alfred Hitchcock's Mystery Magazine
- Alfred Hitchcock's unrealized projects
- List of Academy Award winners and nominees from Great Britain
- List of British film directors
- List of cameo appearances by Alfred Hitchcock
- List of film director and actor collaborations
- Remakes of films by Alfred Hitchcock

== Notes and sources ==
=== Works cited ===
Biographies (chronological)

- Truffaut, François (1983) [1967]. Hitchcock/Truffaut (Revised ed.). New York: Simon & Schuster. ISBN 978-0-671-52601-6.
- Taylor, John Russell (1996) [1978]. Hitch: The Life and Times of Alfred Hitchcock. New York: Da Capo Press.
- Spoto, Donald (1999) [1983]. The Dark Side of Genius: The Life of Alfred Hitchcock. New York: Da Capo Press. ISBN 978-0-306-80932-3.
- Freeman, David (1999). The Last Days of Alfred Hitchcock. Overlook. ISBN 978-0-87951-728-1.
- Adair, Gene (2002). Alfred Hitchcock: Filming Our Fears. New York: Oxford University Press. ISBN 978-0-19-511967-1.
- Duncan, Paul (2003). Alfred Hitchcock: Architect of Anxiety, 1899–1980. Taschen. ISBN 978-3-8228-1591-5.
- McGilligan, Patrick (2003). Alfred Hitchcock: A Life in Darkness and Light. New York: Regan Books. ISBN 978-0-06-039322-9.
- Spoto, Donald (2008). Spellbound by Beauty: Alfred Hitchcock and his Leading Ladies. New York: Harmony Books.
- Ackroyd, Peter (2015). Alfred Hitchcock. Random House. ISBN 978-0-7011-6993-0.

Miscellaneous

- Allen, Richard; Ishii-Gonzalès, S. (2004). Hitchcock: Past and Future. Routledge. ISBN 978-0-415-27525-5.
- Bellour, Raymond; Penley, Constance (2000). The Analysis of Film. Indiana University Press. ISBN 978-0-253-21364-8.
- Brown, Royal S. (1994). Overtones and Undertones: Reading Film Music. University of California Press. ISBN 978-0-520-91477-3.
- Brunsdale, Mitzi M. (2010). Icons of Mystery and Crime Detection: From Sleuths to Superheroes. ABC-CLIO.
- DeRosa, Steven (2001). Writing with Hitchcock. New York: Faber and Faber. ISBN 978-0-571-19990-7.
- Evans, Peter William (2004). "Hitchcock, Alfred Joseph". Oxford Dictionary of National Biography (online ed.). Oxford University Press. doi:10.1093/ref:odnb/31239. (Subscription, Wikipedia Library access or UK public library membership required.)
- Fallaci, Oriana (1963). "Mr. Chastity". The Egotists: Sixteen Surprising Interviews. Chicago: Henry Regnery. pp. 239–256. Archived from the original on 31 December 2017.
- Faretta, Ángel (2019). Hitchcock en obra (in Spanish). Buenos Aires: A Sala llena. ISBN 978-9877616354. Archived from the original on 25 May 2019.
- Garncarz, Joseph (2002). "German Hitchcock". In Gottlieb, Sidney; Brookhouse, Christopher (eds.). Framing Hitchcock: Selected Essays from the Hitchcock Annual. Detroit: Wayne State University Press. pp. 59–81.
- Gottlieb, Sydney (2002). "Early Hitchcock: The German Influence". In Gottlieb, Sidney; Brookhouse, Christopher (eds.). Framing Hitchcock: Selected Essays from the Hitchcock Annual. Detroit: Wayne State University Press. pp. 35–58.
- Gottlieb, Sidney (2003). Alfred Hitchcock: Interviews. University Press of Mississippi. ISBN 978-1-57806-562-2.
- Harris, Robert A.; Lasky, Michael S. (2002) [1976]. The Complete Films of Alfred Hitchcock. Secaucus, N.J: Citadel Press.
- Hitchcock, Alfred (2014). Gottlieb, Sidney (ed.). Hitchcock on Hitchcock, Volume 2: Selected Writings and Interviews. Oakland: University of California Press. ISBN 978-0-520-96039-8.
- Hitchcock O'Connell, Pat; Bouzereau, Laurent (2003). Alma Hitchcock: The Woman Behind the Man. New York: Berkley Books. ISBN 978-0-425-19005-0.
- Humphries, Patrick (1994). The Films of Alfred Hitchcock (reprint ed.). Crescent Books. ISBN 978-0-517-10292-3.
- Kaganski, Serge (1997). Alfred Hitchcock. Paris: Hazan.
- Kapsis, Robert E. (1992). Hitchcock: The Making of a Reputation (illustrated ed.). University of Chicago Press.
- Kehr, Dave (2011). When Movies Mattered: Reviews from a Transformative Decade. University of Chicago Press. ISBN 978-0-226-42940-3. Archived from the original on 29 June 2016.
- Kerzoncuf, Alain; Barr, Charles (2015). Hitchcock Lost and Found: The Forgotten Films. Lexington: University Press of Kentucky.
- Krohn, Bill (2000). Hitchcock at Work. Phaidon. ISBN 978-0-7148-3953-0.
- Leff, Leonard J. (1987). Hitchcock and Selznick. University of California Press. ISBN 978-0-520-21781-2.
- Leff, Leonard (1999). The Rich and Strange Collaboration of Alfred Hitchcock and David O. Selznick in Hollywood. University of California Press. ISBN 978-0-520-21781-2.
- Leigh, Janet; Nickens, Christopher (1995). Psycho: Behind the Scenes of the Classic Thriller. Harmony Press. ISBN 978-0-517-70112-6.
- Leitch, Thomas (2002). The Encyclopedia of Alfred Hitchcock. Checkmark Books. ISBN 978-0-8160-4387-3.
- MacDonald, Erin E. (2012). Ed McBain/Evan Hunter: A Literary Companion. Jefferson: McFarland.
- Moral, Tony Lee (2013). Hitchcock and the Making of Marnie. Lanham: Scarecrow Press.
- Mulvey, Laura (1989) [1975]. "Visual Pleasure and Narrative Cinema". In Mulvey, Laura (ed.). Visual and Other Pleasures. Bloomington: Indiana University Press. pp. 14–24. Free PDF download
- Rebello, Stephen (1990). Alfred Hitchcock and the Making of Psycho. New York: Dembner Books. ISBN 978-0-7145-2915-8.
- Rothman, William (2014). Must We Kill the Thing We Love?: Emersonian Perfectionism and the Films of Alfred Hitchcock. New York: Columbia University Press.
- Sloan, Jane (1995). Alfred Hitchcock: A Filmography and Bibliography. Oakland: University of California Press. ISBN 978-0-520-08904-4.
- Smith, Steven C. (2002). A Heart at Fire's Center: The Life and Music of Bernard Herrmann. Oakland: University of California Press.
- Spoto, Donald (1992) [1976]. The Art of Alfred Hitchcock (2nd ed.). New York: Anchor Books. ISBN 978-0-385-41813-3.
- Verevis, Constantine (2006). "For Ever Hitchcock: Psycho and Its Remakes". In Boyd, David; Palmer, R. Barton (eds.). After Hitchcock: Influence, Imitation, and Intertextuality. Austin: University of Texas Press. pp. 15–30.
- Walker, Michael (2005). Hitchcock's motifs. Amsterdam University Press. ISBN 978-90-5356-773-9.
- Warren, Patricia (2001). British Film Studios: An Illustrated History. B. T. Batsford. ISBN 978-0-7134-7559-3.
- White, Rob; Buscombe, Edward (2003). British Film Institute Film Classics, Volume 1. London: Taylor & Francis. ISBN 978-1-57958-328-6.
- White, Susan (2011). "A Surface Collaboration: Hitchcock and Performance". In Leitch, Thomas; Poague, Leland (eds.). A Companion to Alfred Hitchcock. Chichester: John Wiley & Sons. pp. 181–198.
- Whitty, Stephen (2016). The Alfred Hitchcock Encyclopedia. Lanham and London: Rowman & Littlefield.
- Wood, Robin (2002). Hitchcock's Films Revisited (2nd ed.). New York: Columbia University Press. ISBN 978-0-231-12695-3.
