= List of awards and nominations received by Alfred Hitchcock =

Alfred Hitchcock awards and nominations
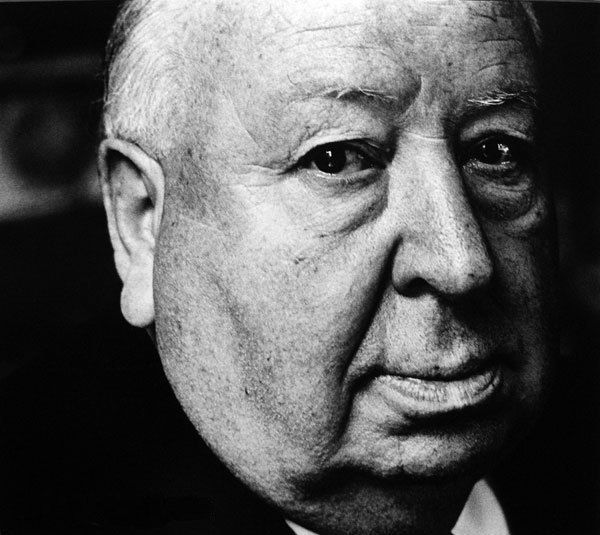
- Hitchcock in 1972
Awards and nominations
Award	Wins	Nominations
Academy Awards	0	5
Primetime Emmy Awards	0	4
Golden Globe Awards	1	2
Directors Guild of America Awards	0	5

Totals (Note: Certain award groups do not simply award one winner. They acknowledge several different recipients, have runners-up, and have third place. Since this is a specific recognition and is different from losing an award, runner-up mentions are considered wins in this award tally. For simplification and to avoid errors, each award in this list has been presumed to have had a prior nomination.)
- Wins: 32
- Nominations: 67

Sir Alfred Hitchcock was an English film director. During a career spanning sixty years, he won a Golden Globe Award and received nominations for five Academy Awards, four Primetime Emmy Awards, and five Directors Guild of America Awards. Widely regarded as one of the most influential figures in the history of cinema, Hitchcock was awarded with such honorary awards as the Irving G. Thalberg Memorial Award in 1968, the BAFTA Fellowship in 1971, the Golden Globe Cecil B. DeMille Award in 1972, and the AFI Life Achievement Award in 1979. He also was knighted by Queen Elizabeth II in 1980, shortly before his death.

In addition, nine movies directed by Hitchcock were inducted into the National Film Registry and four of them are listed in the American Film Institute list of the 100 greatest American movies of all time. Two other his pictures entered the list of the 100 Greatest British Films of the 20th Century, released by British Film Institute in UK.

== Major associations ==
=== Academy Awards ===
The Academy Awards, commonly referred to as the Oscar, is an annual ceremony established by the American Academy of Motion Picture Arts and Sciences (AMPAS) to recognize excellence of professionals in the film industry, including directors, actors, and writers.

Year	Category	Nominated work	Result
Academy Awards
1941	Best Director	Rebecca	Nominated
1945	Best Director	Lifeboat	Nominated
1946	Best Director	Spellbound	Nominated
1955	Best Director	Rear Window	Nominated
1961	Best Director	Psycho	Nominated
1968	Irving G. Thalberg Memorial Award	—N/a	Honored

Oscar-related Performances
Hitchcock has directed many Oscar nominated (and 1 winning) performances.

Year	Performer	Film	Result
Academy Award for Best Actor
1941	Laurence Olivier	Rebecca	Nominated
Academy Award for Best Actress
1941	Joan Fontaine	Rebecca	Nominated
1942	Joan Fontaine	Suspicion	Won
Academy Award for Best Supporting Actor
1941	Albert Bassermann	Foreign Correspondent	Nominated
1946	Michael Chekhov	Spellbound	Nominated
1947	Claude Rains	Notorious	Nominated
Academy Award for Best Supporting Actress
1941	Judith Anderson	Rebecca	Nominated
1948	Ethel Barrymore	The Paradine Case	Nominated
1961	Janet Leigh	Psycho	Nominated

=== Emmy Awards ===
The Emmy Awards, considered as the TV equivalent to the Academy Awards (for film) in U.S., are presented by Academy of Television Arts & Sciences (ATAS), National Academy of Television Arts & Sciences (NATAS) and International Academy of Television Arts & Sciences, in various sectors of the television industry, including entertainment programming, news and documentary shows. Hitchcock was nominated four times.

Year	Category	Nominated work	Result
Primetime Emmy Awards
1956	Best Director - Film Series	Alfred Hitchcock Presents (for episode "The Case of Mr. Pelham")	Nominated
1956	Best MC or Program Host - Male Or Female	—N/a	Nominated
1957	Best Male Personality – Continuing Performance	—N/a	Nominated
1959	Best Direction of a Single Program of a Dramatic Series Less Than One Hour	Alfred Hitchcock Presents (for episode "Lamb to the Slaughter")	Nominated

=== Golden Globe Awards ===
The Golden Globe Award is an accolade presented by the members of the Hollywood Foreign Press Association (HFPA) to recognize excellence in film and television, both domestic and foreign.

Year	Category	Nominated work	Result
Golden Globe Awards
1958	Television Achievement	—N/a	Won
1972	Cecil B. DeMille Award	—N/a	Honored
1973	Best Director – Motion Picture	Frenzy	Nominated

=== Directors Guild of America Awards ===
From 1936, the Directors Guild of America Awards are issued annually by the labor union Directors Guild of America (DGA). The group, formerly identified as Screen Directors Guild, represents the interests of film and television directors in the United States motion picture industry. Lifetime Achievement Award was originally called the D.W. Griffith Lifetime Achievement Award, and it is given since 1953. Hitchcock received the honor in 1968.

Year	Category	Nominated work	Result
Directors Guild of America Awards
1952	Outstanding Directing – Feature Film	Strangers on a Train	Nominated
1955	Outstanding Directing – Feature Film	Rear Window	Nominated
1959	Outstanding Directing – Feature Film	Vertigo	Nominated
1960	Outstanding Directing – Feature Film	North by Northwest	Nominated
1961	Outstanding Directing – Feature Film	Psycho	Nominated
1968	D.W. Griffith Award	—N/a	Honored

== Miscellaneous accolades ==
Award	Year	Category	Work	Result
Cannes Film Festival Awards	1946	Grand Prix du Festival International du Film	Notorious	Nominated
Cannes Film Festival Awards	1953	Grand Prix du Festival International du Film	I Confess	Nominated
Cannes Film Festival Awards	1956	Palme d'Or	The Man Who Knew Too Much	Nominated
Venice Film Festival Awards	1954	Golden Lion	Rear Window	Nominated
Venice Film Festival Awards	1955	Golden Lion	To Catch a Thief	Nominated
San Sebastián International Film Festival Awards	1958	Silver Shell for Best Director	Vertigo	Won
San Sebastián International Film Festival Awards	1959	Silver Shell for Best Director	North by Northwest	Won
National Board of Review Awards	1969	Best Director	Topaz	Won
New York Film Critics Circle Awards	1935	Best Director	The Man Who Knew Too Much; The 39 Steps	Nominated
New York Film Critics Circle Awards	1938	Best Director	The Lady Vanishes	Won
New York Film Critics Circle Awards	1954	Best Director	Rear Window	Nominated

== Other awards and nominations ==
Award	Year	Category	Work	Result
Jussi Awards	1984	Best Foreign Filmmaker	—N/a	Won
Kinema Junpo Awards	1948	Best Foreign Language Film	Suspicion	Won
Laurel Awards	1958	—N/a	Best Producer/Director	Nominated
Laurel Awards	1959	—N/a	Best Producer/Director	Won
Laurel Awards	1960	—N/a	Best Producer/Director	Won
Laurel Awards	1961	—N/a	Best Producer/Director	Won
Laurel Awards	1962	—N/a	Best Producer/Director	Won
Laurel Awards	1963	—N/a	Best Producer/Director	Nominated
Laurel Awards	1964	—N/a	Best Producer/Director	Won
Laurel Awards	1965	—N/a	Best Producer/Director	Nominated
Laurel Awards	1966	—N/a	Best Producer/Director	Won
Laurel Awards	1967	—N/a	Best Producer/Director	Nominated
Laurel Awards	1968	—N/a	Best Producer/Director	Nominated
Laurel Awards	1970	—N/a	Best Producer/Director	Won
Laurel Awards	1971	—N/a	Best Producer/Director	Won

== Honorary awards ==
Organization	Year	Category	Result
Academy of Motion Picture Arts and Sciences	1968	Irving G. Thalberg Memorial Award	Honored
British Academy of Film and Television Arts	1971	BAFTA Fellowship	Honored
American Film Institute	1979	AFI Life Achievement Award	Honored
Mystery Writers of America	1960	Raven Award	Honored
Film Society of Lincoln Center	1974	Gala Tribute	Honored
Order of the British Empire	1962	Commander (CBE)	Declined
Order of the British Empire	1980	Knight Commander (KBE)	Honored
Academy of Science Fiction, Fantasy and Horror Films	1994	The Life Career Award	Honored
Hollywood Walk of Fame	1960	Motion Pictures Star^{[A]}	Honored
Hollywood Walk of Fame	1960	Television Star^{[B]}	Honored

== See also ==
- Alfred Hitchcock filmography
- List of cameo appearances by Alfred Hitchcock
- Themes and plot devices in the films of Alfred Hitchcock

== Notes ==
- A The star is located at 6506 Hollywood Blvd.
- B The star is located at 7013 Hollywood Blvd.
