= Quarry Amphitheater =

Amphitheater on UC Santa Cruz campus

Coordinates: 36.9988°N 122.0566°W

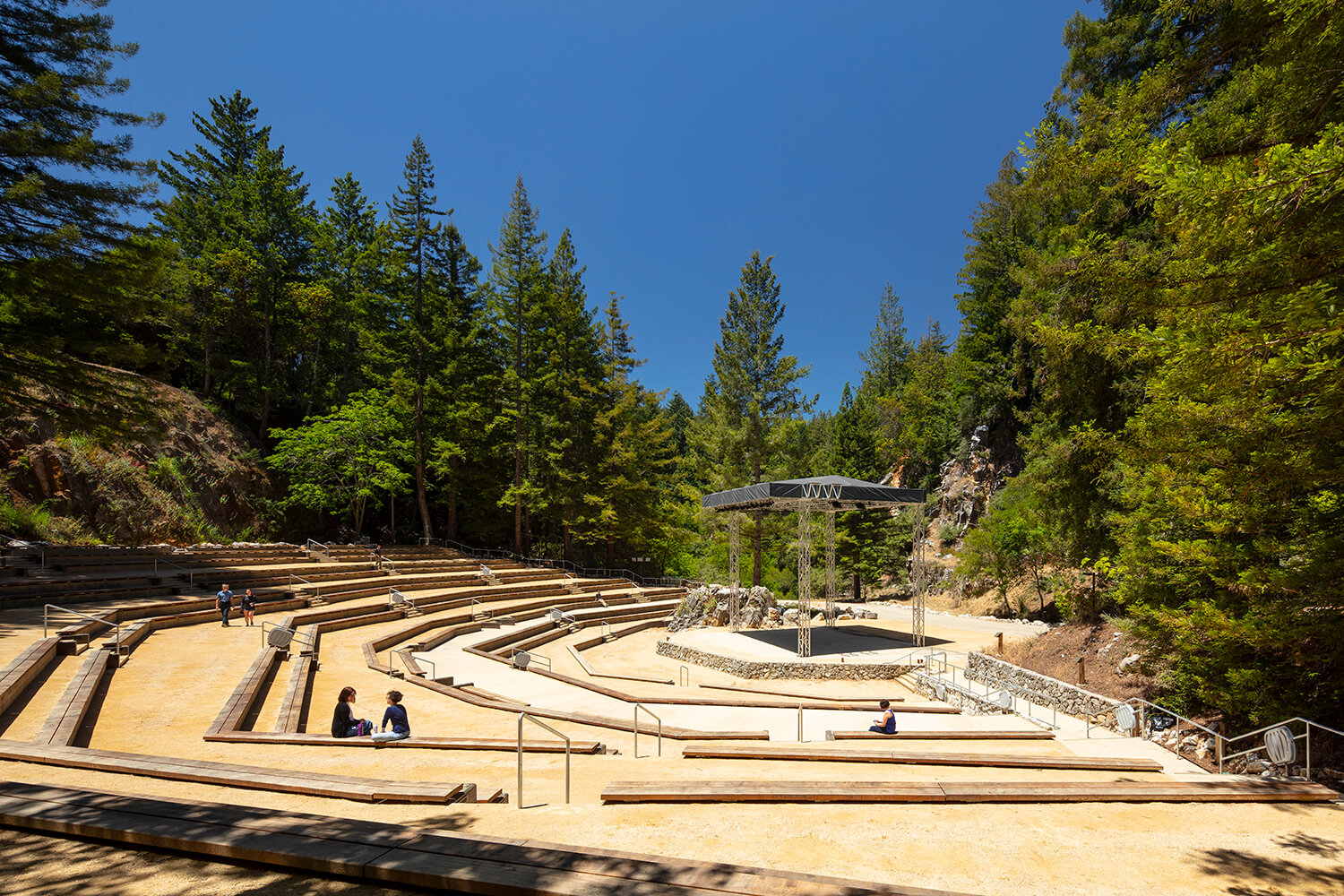
Quarry Amphitheater in the day

The Quarry Amphitheater is a 2,800 capacity outdoor events and concert venue located on the campus of University of California Santa Cruz. First used as a major supplier of limestone in the 1800s, the quarry was repurposed as an amphitheater during the construction of UC Santa Cruz in the early 1960s. Since then, it went through a major reconstruction in 2017 and has become home to a number of campus events as well as hosting major musical acts as the largest outdoor venue in Santa Cruz County. Acts who have performed include Chicano Batman, Carla Morrison, and Orion Sun.

== History ==
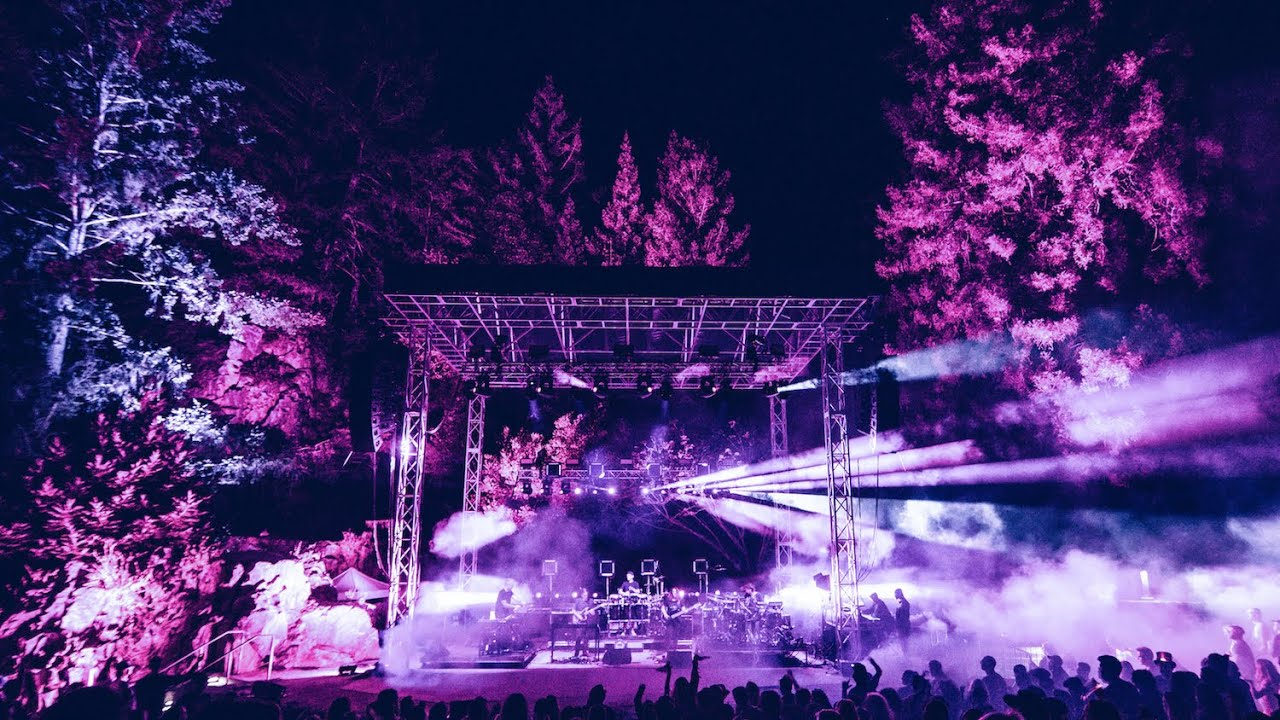
STS9 performing at the Quarry Amphitheater in 2022

The Quarry Amphitheater first functioned as a limestone quarry in the mid-1800s as part of the Cowell Lime Works where the extracted lime would be sent off to areas around the Bay, especially San Francisco, where it was used for constructing buildings. After some decades in use, Henry Cowell's son Harry shut down production of the lime kilns in about 1920, effectively decommissioning the use of the space.

With the construction of the main UC Santa Cruz campus finished in 1965, Robert Royston and his architect firm were commissioned in 1966 to construct the quarry as a central space for the campus to use for events. The concept for the quarry as an amphitheater began, with construction finishing soon afterwards in 1967 at a cost of only $82,600 (equivalent to $798,000 in 2025). At the time of construction, Dean McHenry was inaugurated as the founding Chancellor of UC Santa Cruz in the amphitheater. As the location was not originally designed as a concert venue, the stage was originally made of dirt and relied on a generator for power. On completion, the space was used to host a variety of events and guest speakers such as graduations and local music performances.

Use of the space was strong for some decades, but as time went on, it was used less and less. Eventually, it fell into a state of decay and in 2006 it was closed by the university due to safety, such as the hill face behind the stage began to have falling rocks.

== Restoration ==
In 2014, construction began to restore and reopen the venue. Around $6.38 million was raised from student fee reserves, as well as an additional $1.4 million dollars from the vice chancellor, totaling to an approximately $8 million renovation that begin in late 2016 and finished in fall of 2017.

To commemorate the opening of the Quarry Amphitheater, a private student concert was held on October 14, 2017 where Chicano Batman performed. The amphitheater has been used since to host lectures and graduations in addition to concerts and theater performances.
