= Barbara Howitt =

English mezzo-soprano

Barbara Sheila Howitt (30 Jan 1923 – 19 May 2011) was an English operatic mezzo-soprano. She is most remembered for appearing in the 1956 film The Man Who Knew Too Much directed by Alfred Hitchcock where she sings the solo in the Storm Clouds Cantata by Arthur Benjamin.

== Biography and career ==
Barbara Howitt was born in Romford, Essex, on 30 April 1923. Her parents were John E. Howitt, a school master, and Lilian E. Cuthbert.

Barbara Howitt debuted in the role of Rosina in Rossini's Il barbiere di Siviglia with the Carl Rosa Opera Company in 1948, repeating the role in 1949. Other roles performed in Scotland with various companies included Mercedes in Carmen, Kate Pinkerton in Madama Butterfly, Angelina Semos in Luigi Cherubini's The Water Carrier (1950), Madam Wanton in The Pilgrim's Progress, the voice of the oracle and then Evadne in Walton's Troilus and Cressida, Suzuki in Madama Butterfly, Mamma Lucia in Cavalleria Rusticana, the title role in Carmen, Valencienne in Die Lustige Witwe (1959), and Marcellina in Le nozze di Figaro.

Howitt first appeared with the Covent Garden Opera Company at Covent Garden as Madam Bubble in the world premiere of Ralph Vaughan Williams's opera The Pilgrim's Progress on 26 April 1951. Other roles included the second Norn in Götterdämmerung, Mercedes in Carmen, a flower maiden in Parsifal, the governess in The Queen of Spades, a singer in Sadler's Wells production of Falla's The Three-Cornered Hat, Aninna in Strauss's Der Rosenkavalier, Giovanna in Verdi's Rigoletto, one of the genii in Mozart's Die Zauberflöte, Marcellina in Mozart's The Marriage of Figaro, the shepherd boy in Puccini's Tosca, Amelfa in Rimsky-Korsakov's The Golden Cockerel, Maddelena in Verdi's Rigoletto, Flora in Verdi's La traviata, a maid in Strauss's Elektra, Suzuki in Puccini's Madama Butterfly, Nicklaus in Offenbach's Les contes d'Hoffmann, Evadne and the Voice of the Oracle in Troilus and Cressida, Grimgerde in Wagner's Die Walküre, and Countess Hurwitz in Lehar's The Land of Smiles. Her final performance with the Royal Opera took place on 3 December 1963 where she played Aksinya in Shostakovich's Katerina Ismaillova. In all she was in 77 performances with the Royal Opera House at Covent Garden.

On 10 December 1959 Howitt appeared in the musical The Demon Barber, adapted from George Dibdin Pitt's play of Sweeney Todd. She played the part of Mrs. Lovett to Roy Godfrey's portrayal of Sweeney Todd.

In 1964 she married Rex Russell Justham, an engineer, and retired from professional performance, living in Caversham, Reading, Berkshire, and they had two children. She died in Reading on 19 May 2011.

== Critical appraisal ==
As Howitt played primarily secondary characters, she generally received scant mention in published reviews. Reviewing her debut as Rosina, a critic mentioned both Howitt and Gwent Lewis (playing Almaviva) sang the "contour" of florid passages rather than executing them accurately.

In a 1953 Covent Garden production of Carmen conducted by John Pritchard and directed by Anthony Asquith, critic Philip Hope-Wallace found all the leads wanting except for Howitt. But in a new production of Tales of Hoffmann, Eric Blom took Howitt (playing Niklaus) to task for her anxiety in overplaying her role. Reviewing the premiere of Walton's opera, a critic said Howitt "successfully" took on the role of Evadne. In a 1956 revival of Rigoletto with Tito Gobbi where Howitt played Maddelena, Philip Hope-Wallace said hers was one of a handful of "minor parts from stock doing the company proud."

In the recording issues of the live broadcast of Madama Butterfly from 1957, Ira Siff criticized Howitt for "tending to scoop" although he noted she had "strong scenes" with the Pinkerton (John Lanigan) and the Sharpless (Geraint Evans).

== Recordings ==
- Madama Butterfly (Victoria de los Angeles, Barbara Howitt, John Lanigan, Geraint Evans, and the Chorus and Orchestra of the Royal Opera House, Covent Garden conducted by Rudolf Kempe, recorded 2 May 1957) Melodram 50058.
- De Falla: The Three Cornered Hat (Barbara Howitt - Soprano) Enrique Jorda conducting the London Symphony Orchestra. Classic Records/Everest – SDBR 3057, 2006, USA.

== Filmography ==
- The Man Who Knew Too Much (1956) - Soloist / Herself
- This is Show Business Tv Series - Self. Episode #6.2 (1956)
- Castle Dangerous Tv Movie - Old Meg (1958)
- The Petrified Princess Tv Movie - Voice (1959)
