= Sarah Fischer (soprano) =

Canadian soprano, administrator and educator

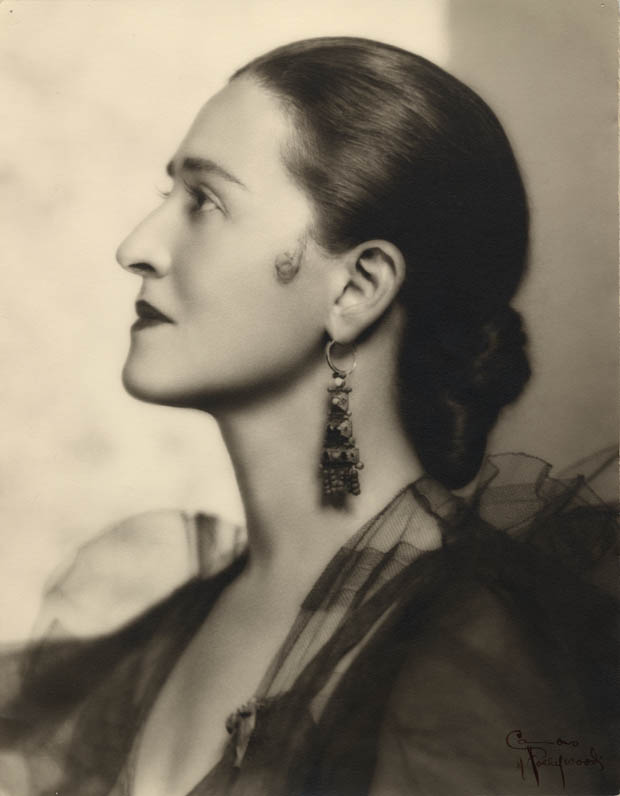
Sarah Fischer in 1939

Sarah Eugenie Fischer (23 February 1896 – 3 May 1975) was a Canadian soprano, arts administrator, and music educator. She was trained as a singer first in Montreal and then in London and Rome. She made her opera debut in Montreal in 1918 and then had a career predominantly in Europe from 1919 to 1940. She returned to Canada in 1940 and retired from the stage in 1942. She was an influential voice teacher and concert manager in Montreal in her later life, operating the Sarah Fischer Concerts series from 1941 until her death in 1975.

== Early life and career ==
The daughter of Jacob Fischer and his wife Dora Fischer (née Wolf), Sarah Eugenie Fischer was born into a Polish-Jewish family in Paris on 23 February 1896. The Fischer family immigrated to Canada when Sarah was 12 years old. She settled with them in the city of Montreal. Her father was a milliner and she worked as a telephone operator while pursuing training as a musician. She studied singing with Joseph-Jean Goulet (solfège) and Céline Marier (vocal technique). She also studied acting with operatic mezzo-soprano Jeanne Maubourg. She earned a diploma from the Académie de musique du Québec in 1917.

Fischer made her professional opera debut in 1918 at the Monument-National as Micaëla in Georges Bizet's Carmen with Cédia Brault in the title role and Albert Roberval conducting. She subsequently starred in other operas in Montreal and Quebec City, among them Philine in Ambroise Thomas's Mignon, Colette in André Messager's La Basoche, and the title part in Léo Delibes's Lakmé (1919).

== Studies in Europe and international career ==
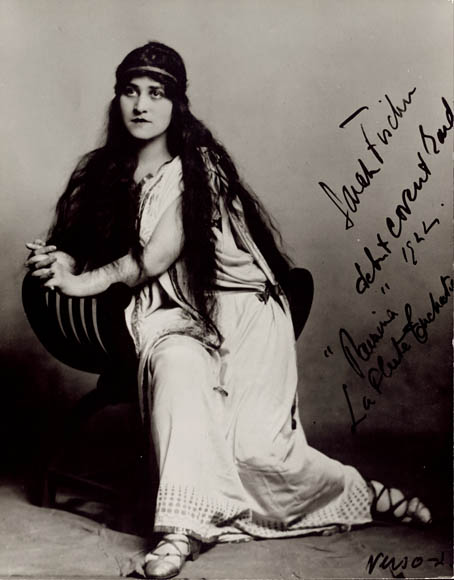
Sarah Fischer as Pamina

From 1919 to 1922 Fischer studied singing with Cecilia M. Hutchinson at the Royal College of Music (RCM) in London. She attended the school after being awarded a Strathcona Scholarship from the Conservatory of Music at McGill University in 1917, also winning the Sol feggio medal that same year. World War I prevented her from leaving Canada for the United Kingdom until two years later. According to journalist and author Debbie Marshall, Fischer was "reportedly a lesbian" and Jewish, and for this reason likely faced challenges in a period when homophobia and anti-semitism were prevalent. The UK-based Canadian journalist Elizabeth Montizambert, who befriended several women known to be lesbians, assisted Fischer's career by introducing her to prominent figures in British society, among them Arthur Balfour. She received further vocal training from Emma Albani, becoming a close friend of the soprano during her time in England.

While a student at the RCM she was active as a concert soprano, and in 1920 she performed the part of Countess Almaviva in The Marriage of Figaro at The Old Vic with Sumner Austin as the Count. She returned to The Old Vic in 1921 in the role of Micaëla. In May 1921 she performed her first recital in the United Kingdom at Wigmore Hall sponsored by the Society of Women Musicians with Mary, Princess Royal and Countess of Harewood in attendance. It was the first of many recitals she performed at that venue during her career.

Fischer was a prima donna of the British National Opera Company in residence at the Royal Opera House (ROH) in 1922 and 1923, performing the roles of Countess Almaviva, Eva in Die Meistersinger von Nürnberg, Marguerite in Faust, and Pamina in The Magic Flute. She notably sang the latter role for the very first radio broadcast recorded live at the ROH on 8 January 1923. She then pursued further studies in Rome with Vincenzo Lombardi before returning to the ROH in 1925 as Countess Olga Sukarev in Umberto Giordano's Fedora. She performed at the ROH only once more in an opera, creating the part of Mrs. Wardle in the world premiere of Albert Coates's Pickwick in 1936.

In 1925 Fischer was a guest artist at the Opera Comique in Paris where she had success in the role of Mélisande from Claude Debussy's Pelléas et Mélisande. She became closely associated with this role first repeating it at the Opéra de Monte-Carlo in 1926 followed by further performances at the Algerian National Theater Mahieddine Bachtarzi among other locations. In 1927 she returned to the Opera Comique in the title role of Mignon, notably performing the part for its 1600th performance at that opera house. The same year she performed a recital in Montreal's Windsor Hall, followed by further recitals in Toronto, Ottawa, and Quebec. She also gave a private recital in New York with Giuseppe Bamboschek, then conductor at the Metropolitan Opera, in New York.

In 1928 she performed at Théâtre des Champs-Élysées as part of the International Mozart Festival. Roles she performed there under conductor Bruno Walter included Pamina in The Magic Flute, Dorabella in Così fan tutte and Cherubino in The Marriage of Figaro, the latter with Gabrielle Ritter-Ciampi as Countess Almaviva. The same year she was the vocal soloist in the first complete performance given in London of Manuel de Falla's El amor brujo, which was performed under the baton of Edward Clark. In July 1928 she performed a concert with the London Chamber Orchestra which was broadcast on the radio.

Fischer gave concerts in Montreal under the auspices of Ladies' Morning Musical Club in 1927, 1930, and 1936. She performed recitals at Wigmore Hall in London (1928) and the Salle Gaveau in Paris (1929) with pianist Herbert Carrick. Carrick and Fischer were husband and wife, marrying in Paris on 21 December 1928, at the Mairie du 17e arrondissement de Paris. On 5 March 1929 Sarah performed in a concert of chamber music with Béla Bartok that was broadcast on BBC Radio. In November 1929 appeared in a concert in New York at Broadway's Martin Beck Theatre with baritone Reinald Werrenrath taking on the role of conductor. She also had great success in concerts in Berlin in 1929.

In 1931 Fischer starred as the poet's wife in the world premiere of Arthur Benjamin's opera The Devil Take Her which was conducted by Thomas Beecham. On 6 July 1934, Fischer performed in the first BBC television broadcast of opera music, performing excerpts of the title role from Carmen opposite Heddle Nash as Don José. Her other opera repertoire included the title role in Madama Butterfly. She remained active as a concert singer in Europe until returning to live in Montreal in 1940, a decision made partly due to the onset of World War II, and partly due to the illness of her father.

== Later life ==
Fischer retired from performance in 1942 after giving a farewell concert in Montreal. She thereafter was active as a voice teacher in that city. Her notable students included tenor Roger Doucet, soprano Yolande Dulude, and bass Jean-Pierre Hurteau. She founded an influential concert series, the Sarah Fischer Concerts (SFC), that provided young Canadian singers and composers with early professional performance opportunities. The first of these concerts was held on 1 February 1941, and Fischer continued to regularly present these until her death 34 years later. According to Karl-Josef Kutsch and Leo Riemens, "she had a significant influence on musical life in Canada."

Fischer died at the age of 79 at Hôtel-Dieu Hospital in Montréal on 3 May 1975.

== Recordings ==
In 1919 Fischer recorded eight songs with Pathé Records out of the French company's studio in New York City. Among these included recordings of the arias "Je dis que rien ne m'épouvante" from Carmen and the Bell Song from Lakmé; Hercule de Fontenailles's "Les baisers sont des fleurs"; Moritz Moszkowski's "Serenata"; and Eva Dell'Acqua and Jules Barbier's "Menuet". She made several recordings for His Master's Voice (HMV) in the 1920s. In December 1923 HMV released recordings of Fischer singing arrangements of English Renaissance songs by Thomas Campion, John Dowland, and John Bartlet with a string quartet. These arrangements were made by Frederick Keel and published by Boosey & Hawkes under the title Elizabethan Love Songs.

In 1939 Fischer recorded six more songs in London, this time for Filmophone Ltd. They included songs by Joseph Haydn, Mana-Zucca, Alice Chambers Bunten, Thomas Dunhill, and Clara Edwards. In 1967 a compilation LP entitled Sarah Fischer was released in Canada, and recordings of her were included on the 1993 album Great Voices of Canada (Analekta).
