= The Man Who Knew Too Much (1956 film) =

1956 film by Alfred Hitchcock

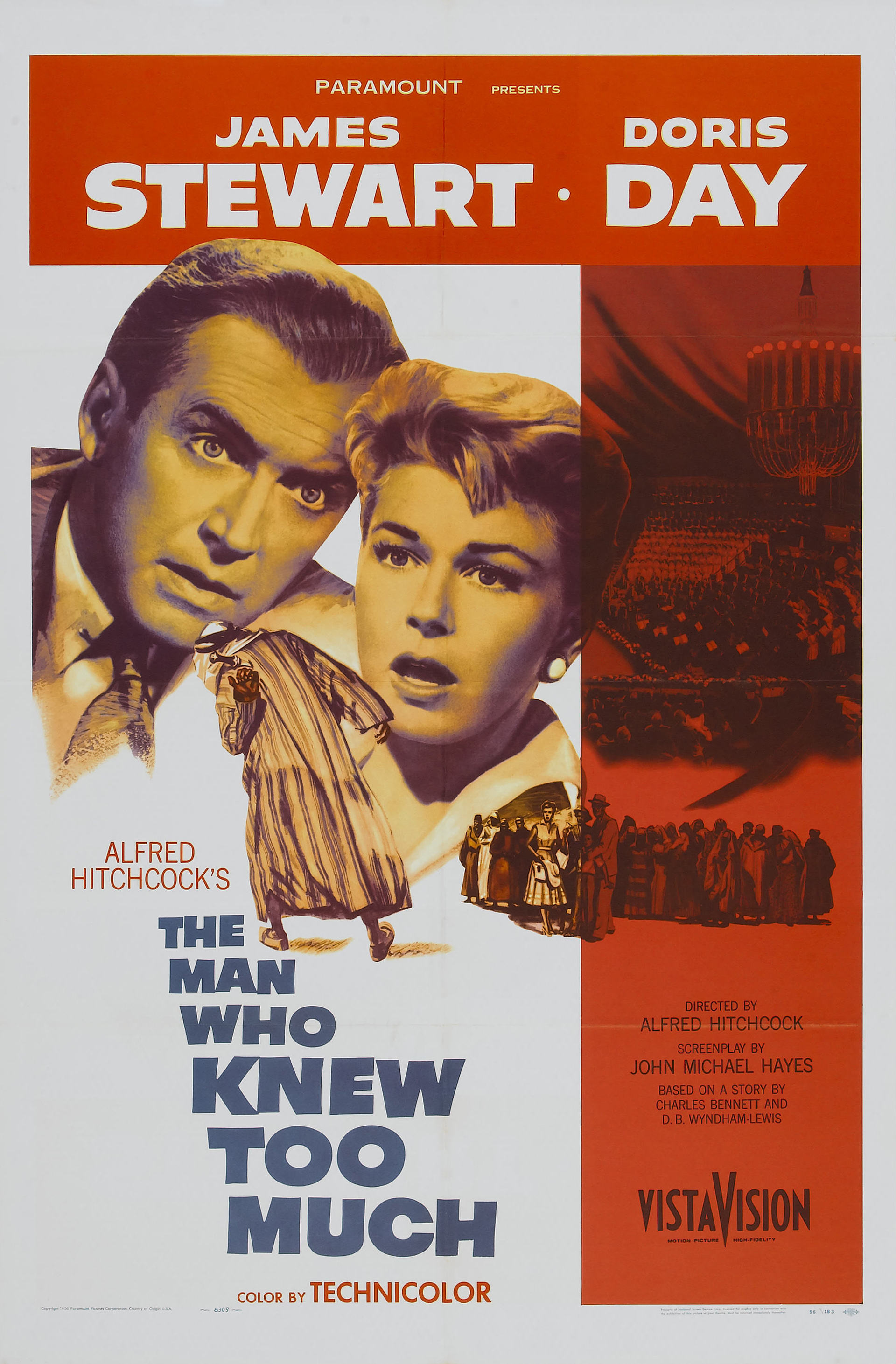
- Theatrical release poster
- Directed by: Alfred Hitchcock
- Screenplay by: John Michael Hayes
- Story by: Charles Bennett; D. B. Wyndham-Lewis
- Produced by: Alfred Hitchcock
- Starring: James Stewart; Doris Day
- Cinematography: Robert Burks
- Edited by: George Tomasini
- Music by: Bernard Herrmann
- Production companies: Filwite Productions; Spinel Entertainment
- Distributed by: Paramount Pictures (Note: After the film's release, Paramount transferred the distribution rights to Hitchcock's estate, where they were acquired by Universal Pictures in 1983.)
- Release dates: April 29, 1956 (Cannes); May 16, 1956 (New York City)
- Running time: 120 minutes
- Country: United States
- Language: English
- Budget: $1.2 million
- Box office: $11.3 million

The Man Who Knew Too Much is a 1956 American mystery thriller film directed and produced by Alfred Hitchcock, starring James Stewart and Doris Day. It is a remake of Hitchcock's own 1934 film of the same name, with a similar but significantly altered plot.

In the book-length interview Hitchcock/Truffaut (1966), in response to fellow filmmaker François Truffaut's assertion that aspects of the remake were by far superior, Hitchcock replied, "Let's say the first version is the work of a talented amateur and the second was made by a professional."

The film won an Academy Award for Best Original Song for "Que Sera, Sera", sung by Doris Day. It premiered at the Cannes Film Festival on April 29, 1956.

== Plot ==
An American family – Dr. Ben McKenna, his wife, popular singer Jo Conway, and their son Hank – are vacationing in French Morocco. Traveling from Casablanca to Marrakesh, they meet Frenchman Louis Bernard. He seems friendly, but Jo is suspicious of his many questions and evasive answers.

Bernard offers to take the McKennas to dinner, but cancels when a suspicious-looking man knocks at the McKennas' hotel-room door. At a restaurant, the McKennas meet friendly English couple Lucy and Edward Drayton. The McKennas are surprised to see Bernard arrive and sit elsewhere, apparently ignoring them.

The next day, visiting the Jemaa el-Fnaa with the Draytons, the McKennas see a man chased by police. After being stabbed in the back, the man approaches Ben, who discovers he is Bernard in disguise. The dying Bernard whispers that a foreign statesman will be assassinated in London and that Ben must tell the authorities about "Ambrose Chappell". Lucy returns Hank to the hotel while Ben, Jo and Edward go to a police station for questioning about Bernard's death. An officer explains that Bernard was a French Intelligence agent.

Ben receives a phone call at the police station; Hank has been kidnapped but will not be harmed if the McKennas say nothing to the police about Bernard's warning. Knowing Hank was left in Lucy's care, Ben dispatches Edward to locate him. When Ben and Jo return to the hotel, they discover Edward checked out. Ben realizes the Draytons are the couple Bernard was looking for and are involved in Hank's abduction. When he learns the Draytons are from London, he decides he and Jo should go there and try to find them through Ambrose Chappell.

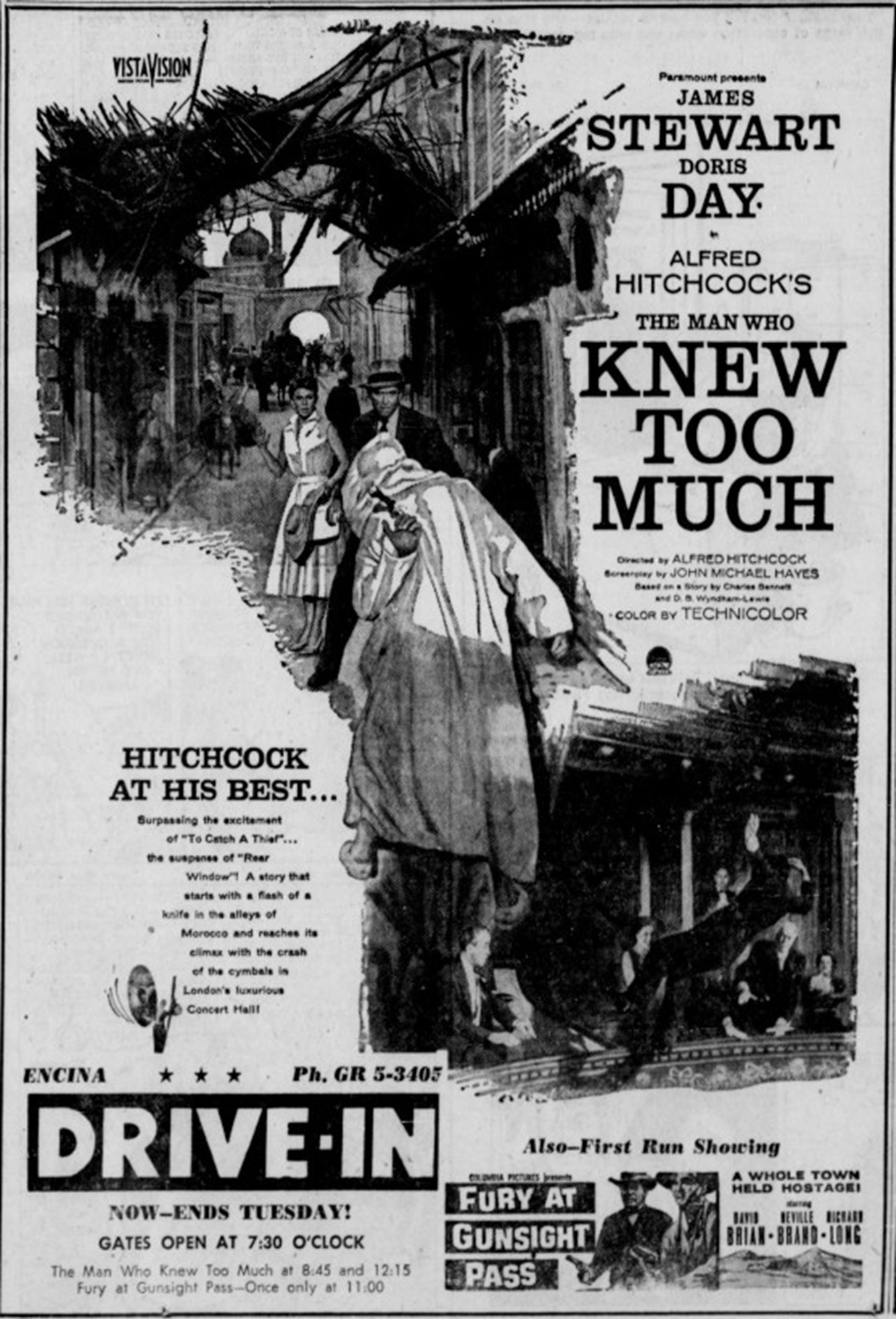
Drive-in advertisement from 1956.

In London, Scotland Yard's Inspector Buchanan tells Jo and Ben that Bernard was in Morocco to uncover an assassination plot; they are instructed to contact him if they hear from the kidnappers. Leaving Jo's friends in their hotel suite, the McKennas search for a person named Ambrose Chappell. Jo realizes that "Ambrose Chapel" is a place, and the McKennas arrive at the chapel to find Edward leading a service. Jo leaves the chapel to call the police. After Edward sends his congregation home, Ben confronts him and is knocked out and locked inside. Jo arrives with the police, but they cannot enter without a warrant.

Jo learns that Buchanan has gone to a concert at the Royal Albert Hall, and asks the police to take her there. Once the police and Jo leave, the Draytons take Hank to a foreign embassy. In the Royal Albert Hall lobby, Jo sees the man who came to her door in Marrakesh. When he threatens to harm Hank if she interferes, she realizes he is the assassin sent to kill the foreign prime minister.

Ben escapes the chapel through its bell tower and reaches the Royal Albert Hall, where Jo points out the assassin. Ben searches the balcony boxes for the killer, who is waiting for a cymbal crash to mask his gunshot. Just before the cymbals crash, Jo screams and the assassin misses his mark, only wounding his target. Ben struggles with the would-be killer, who falls to his death.

Concluding that Hank is likely to be at the embassy, but that it is sovereign and exempt from an investigation, the McKennas secure an invitation from the grateful prime minister. The ambassador organized the plot to kill the prime minister, and blames the failed attempt on the Draytons. Knowing that Hank can testify against them, he orders the Draytons to kill the boy.

The prime minister asks Jo to sing. She loudly performs "Que Sera, Sera", so that Hank will hear her. Lucy, who is guarding Hank while Edward prepares to murder him, is distressed at the prospect of killing a child, so she encourages the boy to whistle along with the song. Ben finds Hank. Edward tries escaping with them at gunpoint, but when Ben hits him, he falls down the stairs to his death.

The McKennas return to their hotel suite. Ben explains to Jo's now-sleeping friends, "I'm sorry we were gone so long, but we had to go over and pick up Hank."

== Cast ==
Original trailer of the film The Man Who Knew Too Much (1956)

- James Stewart as Dr. Benjamin "Ben" McKenna
- Doris Day as Josephine "Jo" Conway McKenna
- Brenda de Banzie as Lucy Drayton
- Bernard Miles as Edward Drayton
- Ralph Truman as Inspector Buchanan
- Daniel Gélin as Louis Bernard
- Mogens Wieth as ambassador
- Alan Mowbray as Val Parnell
- Hillary Brooke as Jan Peterson
- Christopher Olsen as Henry "Hank" McKenna
- Reggie Nalder as Rien
- Richard Wattis as assistant manager
- Noel Willman as Woburn
- Alix Talton as Helen Parnell
- Yves Brainville as police inspector in Marrakech
- Carolyn Jones as Cindy Fontaine
- Betty Baskcomb as Edna, the church organist
- John Barrard as taxidermist (uncredited)

Alfred Hitchcock's cameo is a signature occurrence in most of his films. In The Man Who Knew Too Much, he can be seen 25:42 into the film, in the lower left corner, watching acrobats in the Moroccan market, with his back to the camera, wearing a light gray suit, and putting his hands into his pockets, just before the spy is killed. Bernard Herrmann, who wrote the film score, cameos as the conductor at Royal Albert Hall, the only time Herrmann appeared on-camera in a film.

== Production ==
Alfred Hitchcock first considered an American remake of The Man Who Knew Too Much in 1941, but only brought back the idea in 1956 to make a film that would fulfill a contractual demand from Paramount Pictures. The studio agreed it was a picture that could be well-adapted to the new decade. The Royal Albert Hall sequence drew some inspiration from H. M. Bateman's comic "The One-Note Man", which followed the daily life of a musician who plays only one note in a symphony, similar to the cymbal player in the film.

=== Writing ===
Screenwriter John Michael Hayes was hired on the condition that he would not watch the early version nor read its script, with all the plot details coming from a briefing with Hitchcock. Only the opening scenes of the script were ready when filming began, and Hayes had to send the subsequent script pages by airmail as he finished them.

=== Soundtrack ===
Hitchcock's frequent composer Bernard Herrmann wrote the "background" film score; however, Arthur Benjamin's Storm Clouds Cantata, conducted by Herrmann, is source music in the climax of the film. Herrmann was given the option of composing a new cantata for the film's climax but he found Arthur Benjamin's cantata Storm Clouds from the original 1934 film to be so suitable that he declined; he did, however, expand the orchestration, and inserted several repeats to make the sequence longer. Herrmann can be seen conducting the London Symphony Orchestra with mezzo-soprano Barbara Howitt and chorus during the Royal Albert Hall scenes. The sequence in the Royal Albert Hall runs for 12 minutes without any dialogue from the beginning of Storm Clouds Cantata until the climax when Doris Day's character screams.

Doris Day's character in the film is a well-known, now retired, professional singer, and at two points in the film she sings the Livingston and Evans song "Que Sera, Sera (Whatever Will Be, Will Be)", a performance which won the 1956 Academy Award for Best Original Song. Day's recording of the song reached number two on the US pop charts. and number one in the UK. Day's son Terry, who was twelve-years-old at the time, traveled with her to the film location in Marrakesh, Morocco. Day recalled that her "publicity agent in Hollywood had promised him so much money for each letter he'd send to him telling about all the happenings" going on with the film.

== Reception ==
Reviews for the film were generally positive, although some critics expressed a preference for the 1934 original. Bosley Crowther of The New York Times wrote: "James Stewart tops his job in Rear Window as the man who knows too much, and Doris Day is surprisingly effective as the mother who is frantic about her child ... Even in mammoth VistaVision, the old Hitchcock thriller-stuff has punch." Variety wrote that, while Hitchcock draws "the footage out a bit long at 119 minutes, he still keeps suspense working at all times and gets strong performances from the two stars and other cast members."

Harrison's Reports called the film a "highly exciting and entertaining suspense thriller" that "grips the audience from start to finish." Richard L. Coe of The Washington Post also liked the film, calling it "a dandy of its popular kind" if "a wee bit too leisurely." John McCarten of The New Yorker wrote in a negative review saying that while the remake was "unquestionably bigger and shinier than the original, it doesn't move along with anything like the agility of its predecessor. There can be no doubt, of course, that Mr. Hitchcock at one time was a master of celluloid suspense, but increasingly of late he has been turning out movies that are too overweight to indulge in the tricks of his salad days."

The Monthly Film Bulletin wrote: "Although a quite entertaining thriller, with some characteristically shrewd and caustic Hitchcock touches, it is likely to disappoint devotees of the first film. It lacks the earlier pace and excitement; the peculiarly English charm of the original has been exchanged for a vague VistaVision and Technicolor cosmopolitanism; the dentist episode and the siege climax are unhappily missing." C. A. Lejeune of The Observer wrote that the plot had "a tendency to meander" with "jokes that may have looked more humorous in typescript," concluding that the film was "strong" as long as it stuck to the main plot, "But the first Man Who Knew Too Much was stronger in every way."

The film was a commercial success. Filmed on a budget of $1.2 million, it grossed $11,333,333 at the domestic box office, earning $4.1 million in U.S. theatrical rentals.

On the review aggregator website Rotten Tomatoes, the film has an approval score of 89% based on 44 reviews, with an average rating of 7.8/10. The website's critics consensus reads: "Remaking his own 1934 film, Hitchcock imbues The Man Who Knew Too Much with picturesque locales and international intrigue, and is helped by a brilliantly befuddled performance from James Stewart." At Metacritic, the film has a weighted average score of 76 out of 100, based on ten critics, indicating "generally favorable" reviews.

In 2004, American Film Institute included the song "Que Sera, Sera (Whatever Will Be, Will Be)" as No. 48 in AFI's 100 Years...100 Songs.

== Home media ==
The Man Who Knew Too Much was kept out of re-release by Hitchcock until 1983 when it was acquired by Universal Pictures. The film has been released on home video by Universal Pictures Home Entertainment in VHS, Betamax, Laserdisc, DVD, Blu-ray and 4K Blu-Ray formats.

A documentary on the making of the film was produced for the 2000 DVD, including interviews with Hitchcock's daughter Patricia Hitchcock and members of the production crew. It has been included on the later Blu-Ray and 4K Blu-Ray releases as well.

For the 2023 4K Blu-Ray, the film was completely restored and the original theatrical Perspecta audio elements were discovered, allowing that early forerunner to stereo to be included with the film for the first time since its original release.

== See also ==
- List of American films of 1956
- Djemaa el Fna – Marrakesh marketplace
- "Mr. Yin Presents" – an episode of Psych based completely on Alfred Hitchcock films
- Remakes of films by Alfred Hitchcock
