= Eric Freifeld =

Russian-born Canadian realist painter, active in the mid to late 20th century

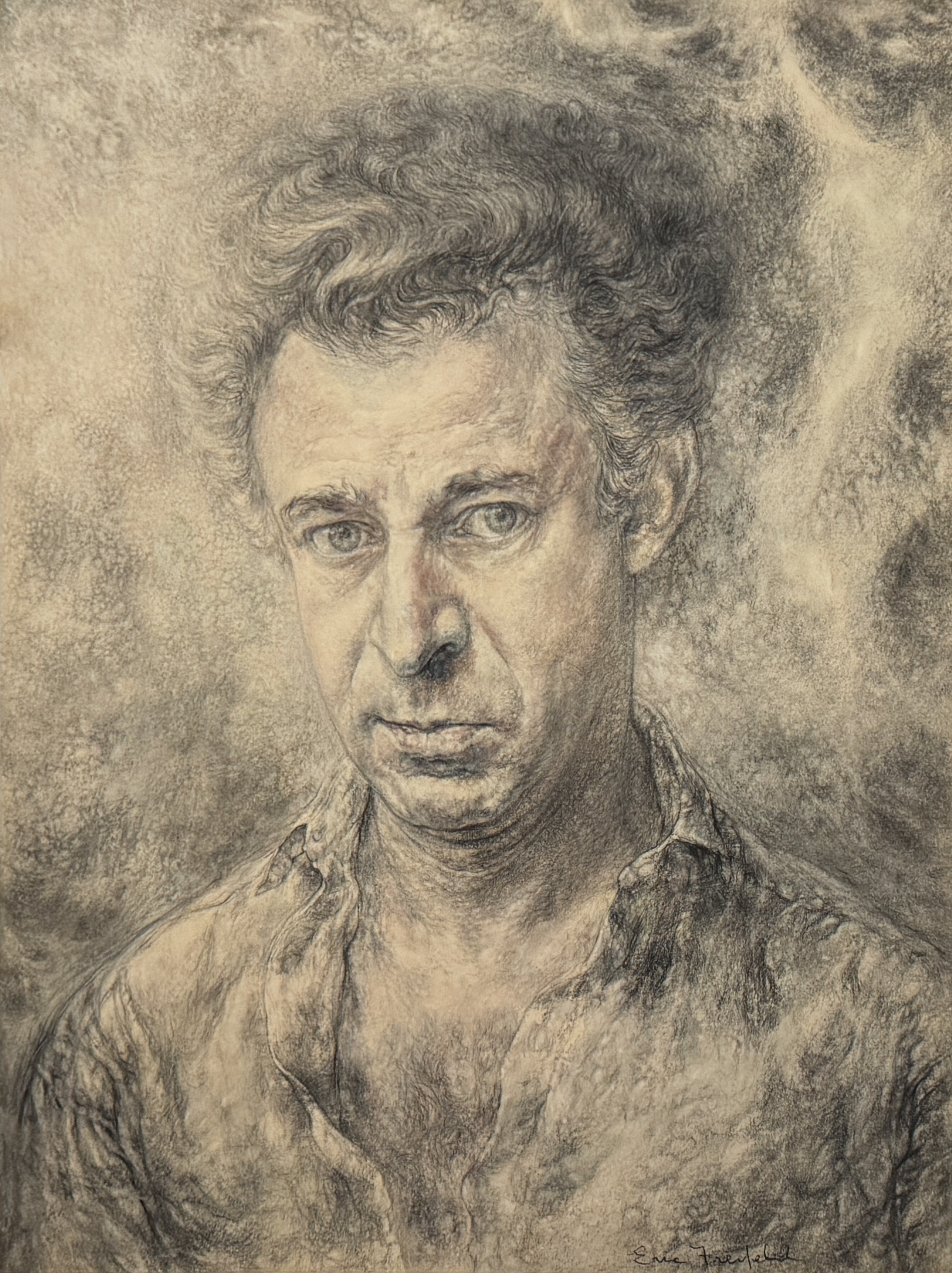
- Eric Freifeld Self-Portrait 1962-65, Collection of the Art Gallery of Ontario
- Born: 13 March 1919; Saratov, U.S.S.R.
- Died: 3 September 1984 (aged 65); Toronto, Canada
- Occupations: Artist & Painter
- Years active: c. 1940-1984
- Known for: Realist painter

Eric Freifeld (1919-1984),.., Canadian realist painter and educator, active from c. 1940 to c. 1984. His pictures are in private and public collections in Canada and elsewhere, including the National Gallery, Ottawa; the Montreal Museum of Fine Art; the Vancouver Art Gallery; the Art Museum at the University of Toronto; and the Art Gallery of Ontario, Toronto. Freifeld was in group shows and one-man shows in Canada and the UK. He was the recipient of Canada Council awards, a Canada Council Senior Arts Fellowship, and in 1983 he was made an Honorary Fellow of The Ontario College of Art and Design.

== Life and career ==
Freifeld was born in Saratov, U.S.S.R. in 1919, emigrating to Canada with his mother and sister in 1924. While attending elementary and high school he painted in his spare time, eventually quitting school at the age of 16, and receiving a Carnegie Trust scholarship to attend the Banff Summer School of Fine Arts. Shortly after, Freifeld travelled in the UK, attended classes at the St Martin's School of Art, and in February 1939, had an exhibition of 14 works in London's Brook Street Gallery. The Brook Street show was favorably reviewed by a critic at the time, Eric Newton of the London Times, who commented "He composes well; he has an exceedingly good sense of tone, so that he is able to apply his colours firmly and directly, and his handling of the medium is broad and free"

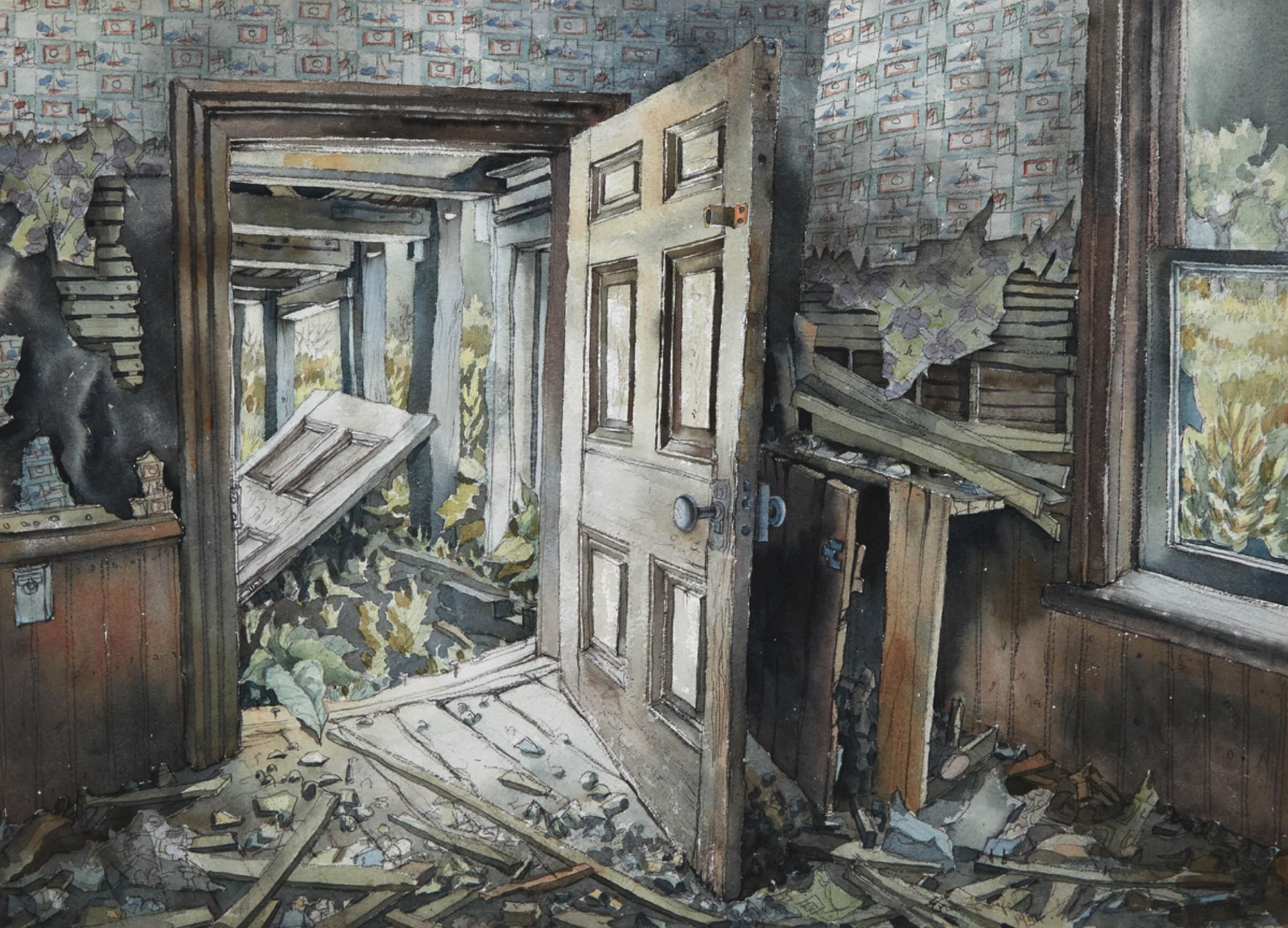
Back Door, 1954 (private collection, Canada)

With the threat of war in Europe, Freifeld returned to Canada, where the Australian conductor Arthur Benjamin helped to arrange for a one-man museum exhibition at the Vancouver Art Gallery in 1940.. He enlisted in the Canadian Army from 1942 to 1944, as artist on staff at the Canadian Camouflage School, and from 1944 to 1946 he studied at the Art Students League of New York. In 1946, Freifeld began his 34-year career at the Ontario College of Art and Design, where he was a drawing instructor and later Chair of the Department of Fine Art, retiring in 1980. During OCAD years he produced a large series of sustained, detailed paintings of abandoned buildings, including the 1954 watercolor, "Back Door". In 1986, a posthumous retrospective exhibition was held in the Rodman Hall Arts Centre, St.Catherines, and the Art Gallery of Ontario, Toronto

== Illness and Death ==
Freifeld struggled with illness and depression throughout his life, and was hospitalized for 17 months with tuberculosis in the Hamilton Mountain Sanitarium in 1938. The artist eventually took his own life in Toronto in 1984

== Legacy ==
As an educator, Freifeld taught a number of artists, including the cartoonist Duncan Macpherson, illustrator Will Davies, animator Richard Williams, sculptor William McElcheran, printmaker David Blackwood, and the painters Ken Danby, John Gould, and William Kurelek. He was friends with a number of international artists, including Pietro Annigoni, Gershon Iskowitz, and Raphael Soyer. Soyer wrote about Freifeld's approach in the introduction to the 1977 monograph on the artist:

"… What was once said about an early French master can be applied to him, (that) every detail in his painting or drawing reveals some internal geography."
