= The Man Who Knew Too Much (1934 film) =

1934 film by Alfred Hitchcock

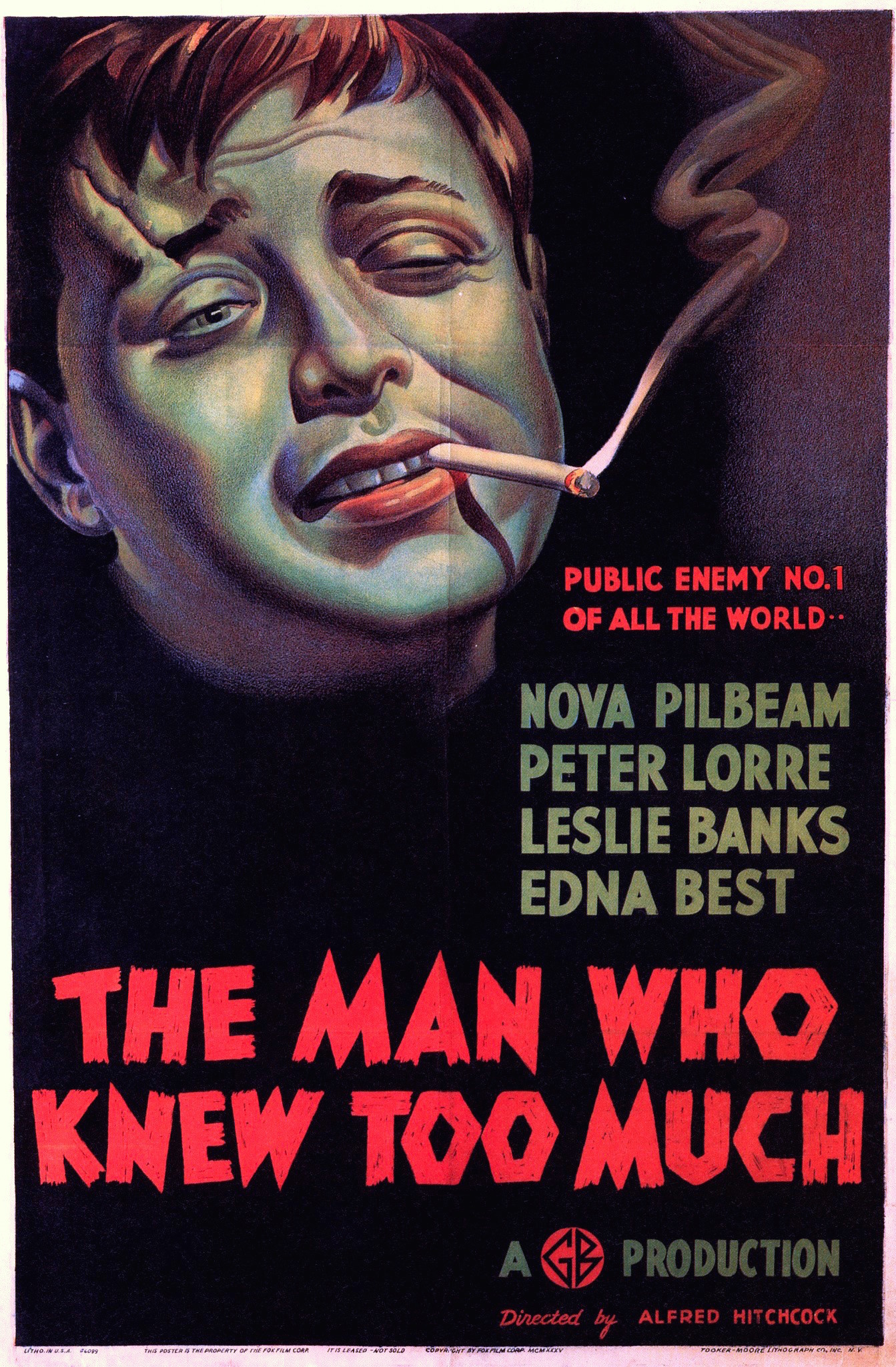
- US film poster
- Directed by: Alfred Hitchcock
- Written by: Charles Bennett; D. B. Wyndham-Lewis; Edwin Greenwood (scenario); A. R. Rawlinson (scenario)
- Produced by: Michael Balcon (uncredited)
- Starring: Leslie Banks; Edna Best; Peter Lorre; Nova Pilbeam; Frank Vosper
- Cinematography: Curt Courant
- Edited by: Hugh Stewart
- Music by: Arthur Benjamin
- Distributed by: Gaumont-British Picture Corporation
- Release date: 9 December 1934 (United Kingdom)
- Running time: 75 minutes
- Country: United Kingdom
- Language: English
- Budget: £40,000 (estimated)

The Man Who Knew Too Much is a 1934 British spy thriller film directed by Alfred Hitchcock for Gaumont-British, starring Leslie Banks and Peter Lorre. It was one of the most successful and critically acclaimed films of Hitchcock's British period.

Hitchcock remade the film in 1956, with James Stewart and Doris Day in leading roles. The two films are very similar in tone and plot, with significant modifications. In the book-length interview Hitchcock/Truffaut (1967), in response to filmmaker François Truffaut's assertion that aspects of the remake were by far superior, Hitchcock replied, "Let's say the first version is the work of a talented amateur and the second was made by a professional." However, some critics have concluded that Hitchcock's statement should not be taken at face value.

The 1934 film has nothing except the title in common with G. K. Chesterton's 1922 book of the same name. Hitchcock decided to use the title because he held the film rights for some of the stories in the book.

== Plot ==
Bob and Jill Lawrence, a British couple on a trip to Switzerland with their daughter Betty, befriend Frenchman Louis Bernard, who is staying at their hotel. Jill is participating in a clay pigeon shooting contest. She reaches the final but loses to her rival sharpshooter, Ramon Levine, because at the crucial moment she is distracted by a chiming watch belonging to a Mr. Abbott.

That evening, Louis is shot as Jill dances with him. Before he dies, he tells Jill where to find a note intended for the British consul; she in turn tells Bob. Bob reads the note, which warns of a planned international crime.

The criminals involved in the shooting kidnap Betty, and threaten to kill her if her parents tell anyone what they know. Unable to seek help from the police, Bob and Jill return to England, where they discover that the group, led by Abbott, have hired Ramon to shoot a European head of state during a concert at the Royal Albert Hall. Jill attends the concert and throws Ramon's aim off by screaming at the crucial moment.

The criminals return to their lair behind the temple of a sun-worshipping cult. Bob had entered the temple searching for Betty, and both are being held prisoner in the adjoining house. The police surround the building and a gunfight ensues, resulting in a number of policemen being shot and killed. The criminals hold out until their ammunition runs low and most of them have been killed.

Betty climbs up to the roof, fleeing from Ramon, who follows her. A police marksman dares not shoot at him because Betty is so close. Jill grabs the rifle and shoots Ramon, who falls off the roof.

The police storm the building. Abbott, the criminal mastermind, is hiding inside but he is betrayed by the chiming of his watch. He shoots himself (shown by gunshot smoke) and dies. Betty is reunited with her parents.

== Cast ==
- Leslie Banks as Bob Lawrence, the title character
- Edna Best as Jill Lawrence
- Peter Lorre as Abbott
- Frank Vosper as Ramon Levine
- Hugh Wakefield as Clive
- Nova Pilbeam as Betty Lawrence
- Pierre Fresnay as Louis Bernard
- Cicely Oates as Nurse Agnes
- D. A. Clarke-Smith as Binstead
- George Curzon as Gibson

== Production ==
Before switching to the project, Hitchcock was reported to be working on Road House (1934), which was eventually directed by Maurice Elvey. The film started when Hitchcock and writer Charles Bennett tried to adapt a Bulldog Drummond story revolving around international conspiracies and the kidnapping of a baby; its original title was Bulldog Drummond's Baby. The deal for an adaptation fell through, and the frame of the plot was reused in the script for The Man Who Knew Too Much, the title itself taken from an unrelated G.K. Chesterton compilation.

The story is credited to Bennett and D. B. Wyndham Lewis. Bennett claimed that Lewis had been hired to write some dialogue that was never used and provided none of the story, though this account has been disputed.

It was Peter Lorre's second English-language film, following the multiple-language version of M (1931). But he was still unable to speak English, having only recently fled Nazi Germany, and learned his lines phonetically.

The shoot-out at the end of the film was based on the Sidney Street Siege, a real-life incident that took place in London's East End (where Hitchcock grew up) on 3 January 1911. The shoot-out was not included in Hitchcock's 1956 remake.

Hitchcock hired Australian composer Arthur Benjamin to write a piece of music especially for the set piece at the Royal Albert Hall. The music, known as the Storm Clouds Cantata, is used in both the 1934 version and the 1956 remake.

Alfred Hitchcock's cameo appears 33 minutes into the film. He can be seen crossing the street from right to left in a black trenchcoat before Bob and Clive enter the chapel.

== Release ==
According to Bennett, C.M. Woolf "who literally controlled the cinema in England in those days" hated the film and told Michael Balcon that Woolf's company, General Film Distributors, would not release it "unless it was remade with a new director, different cast, different writers, everything. Hitch was broken-hearted." However Hitchcock appealed to Isidore Ostrer who owned Gaumont-British and Ostrer persuaded Woolf to release the film. Bennett said the movie "was a vast success - much to C.M. Woolf's fury, of course" but says General Film Distributors put the movie out as a support feature "which meant that the picture never really got its money back - which was a dreadful bit of spite on the part of C.M. Woolf."

== Reception ==
Contemporary reviews were positive, with C.A. Lejeune of The Observer stating that she was "happy about this film [...] because of its very recklessness, its frank refusal to indulge in subtleties, to be the most promising work that Hitchcock has produced since Blackmail". The Daily Telegraph referred to it as a "striking come-back" for Hitchcock, while the Daily Mail stated that "Hitchcock leaps once again into the front rank of British directors." The New York Times praised the film as the "raciest melodrama of the new year", noting that it was "excitingly written" and an "excellently performed bit of story-telling". The review praised Hitchcock as "one of England's ablest and most imaginative film makers" and stated that Lorre "lacks the opportunity to be the one-man chamber of horrors that he was in [M]" but "is certainly something to be seen," comparing him favourably to actor Charles Laughton.

The film has an approval rating of 88% on Rotten Tomatoes based on 33 reviews, with an average rating of 7.76/10.

== Bans ==
The film was banned in Norway in January 1935 without citing any reason other than issuing the following statement: The film above is not approved for public viewing in Norway.

== Copyright status and home media ==
The Man Who Knew Too Much is copyrighted worldwide but has been heavily bootlegged on home video. Despite this, various licensed, restored releases have appeared on DVD, Blu-ray and video on demand services from Network Distributing in the UK, Criterion in the US and many others.
