= Overture to an Italian Comedy =

1936 overture composed by Arthur Benjamin

The Overture to an Italian Comedy for orchestra was composed in 1936 by Australian composer Arthur Benjamin; it was first performed in London on 2 March 1937, under the direction of Gordon Jacob. It follows in the tradition established by previous comedy overtures, such as Arnold Bax's Overture to a Picturesque Comedy (1930) and Le Cabaret (1921) by John Foulds.

The piece opens fortissimo, presenting its first main subject in the woodwinds against pizzicato strings and creating a lively mood in the measure of a tarantella. The second theme is much softer, and is presented by a solo French horn. Following this is a gayer melody for two flutes playing in thirds; this is soon taken up by the trumpets, who are instructed in the score to play in a "vulgar" manner. The opening subject returns, followed again by the "vulgar" theme, and the work ends in spirited fashion.

The overture was originally written as the overture to Benjamin's one act comic opera Prima Donna, which was completed in 1933 but not produced until 1949. The published score is subtitled "Ah, perdona se ti inganno", which can be translated as "Sorry you've been troubled".
