= Charles Lee (author) =

British author (1870–1956)

Charles James Lee (2 March 1870 – 11 May 1956) was a British author. He published five novels in the late 19th and early 20th centuries, in addition to many short stories and plays about the working people of Cornwall.

== Life ==
Charles Lee was born in London to an artistic family. He was educated at Highgate School, was awarded a BA from London University in 1889 and published his first novel, Widow Woman, in 1896. Suffering from bad health, he visited Cornwall in 1900 for its better climate, and stayed in Cornwall for seven years. There he lived amongst the group of artists who formed the Newlyn School. His Cornish Tales had an introduction by Sir Arthur Quiller-Couch.

After relocating to the London suburbs, he worked as senior editor for J. M. Dent, where, owing to his talent for editing prose, he came to be known as "the man with the green pen."

== Works ==
- Widow Woman, 1896
- Our Little Town
- Paul Carah Cornishman
- Dorinda's Birthday
- Cynthia in the West
- Chasing Tales: The Lost Stories of Charles Lee, editor Simon Parker, (Giss 'On Books, 2002, ISBN 0-9542150-0-1)
- The Stuffed Owl: an anthology of bad verse (with D.B. Wyndham Lewis) (Dent, London, 1930; enlarged 1948; reissued 2003, ISBN 9781590170380)

As well as a number of short stories he wrote several plays, journals, and musical scores and a guide book of St Mawgan:- The Vale of Lanherne, ISBN 0-907566-45-6. In collaboration with D.B. Wyndham Lewis he compiled The Stuffed Owl, an anthology of bad (mainly inappropriate and bathetic) verse, a volume reissued by New York Review Books Classics in 2003 with an introduction by Billy Collins.

Despite contemporary acclaim, he is almost forgotten today.
