= The Impartial Reporter =

Northern Irish newspaper

- Type: Weekly newspaper
- Format: Broadsheet
- Owner: Newsquest
- Editor: Rodney Edwards
- Founded: 1825
- Headquarters: Enniskillen, County Fermanagh
- Circulation: 6,245 (as of 2023)
- Website: www.impartialreporter.com

The Impartial Reporter is a newspaper based in Enniskillen, County Fermanagh, Northern Ireland which is circulated in Fermanagh, South Tyrone and the border counties of the Republic of Ireland. It is the third-oldest newspaper in Ireland, and is Fermanagh's oldest surviving weekly newspaper.

== 19th century ==
=== Founding ===
The Impartial Reporter was founded in 1825 by William Trimble. Trimble took over from the original owner, printer John Gregsten. William Trimble was called the "Father of the Irish Press". During its early decades, coverage of the Great Famine was one of the top stories. The newspaper emerged the survivor of intense competition by rival newspapers in its early years.

=== The Land War ===
The Impartial Reporter began to take notice of the plight of tenant farmers. It became an early and outspoken champion of poor farmers during the 19th century's Land War. With the passage of the Land Law (Ireland) Act 1881, real reform began to take hold. Still, the newspaper continued to advocate for those who were still being "victimised" by unreasonable rents, the practice of using land courts (which were tilted towards landlords) to intimidate tenants, and other disadvantages. In August 1881, it rejected Parnell's more radical Land League proposals as a threat to social and political order.

The newspaper's campaign on behalf of farmers did not go unanswered. The Fermanagh Times was established in 1880 as a mouthpiece in opposition to the Impartial Reporter and other reformers. It was patronized by land-owning conservatives, and was run by William Ritchie.

=== Unionism ===
In 1885, the editorial position was that the conflict between landlords and tenant farmers was a far more serious issue than the political arguments between Green and Orange factions. The Orange Order was seen as being dominated by landed interests, and was generally opposed. The Impartial Reporter long reserved its opinion on the Home Rule question—backing Gladstone's position.

While the Impartial Reporter remained sceptical of Unionism, the rival Fermanagh Times, reflecting its supporters' views, took an early Unionist stance. The Impartial Reporter eventually converted to supporting Unionist views during the second Home Rule debate in the early 1890s. It gradually became the most vocal advocate for Unionism in the county, eclipsing even the Fermanagh Times.

== Recent history ==
The Impartial Reporter was owned and published by the Trimble family until 2006, one of the last owners being the pianist and composer Joan Trimble (1915–2000). It was then sold to Ulster News Group (a subsidiary of Dunfermline Press, Ltd.). It holds the world's record for being the newspaper to have its ownership longest in the hands of a single family. The Trimble family continued to exercise a managing role in the newspaper.

In 2008, the Impartial Reporter was named as "Newspaper of the Year" in the inaugural Slugger O'Toole political awards.

Dumfermline Press went into receivership after the death of owner Deirdre Romanes and were acquired by management and Lloyds Bank under the name Romanes Media in 2012. Newsquest acquired Romanes Media in 2015.

In 2019, Sarah Saunderson, the editor, quit her job. She said her decision followed a "perfect storm" in which the recession and emerging online competition struck an often devastating blow to local newspapers across the UK.

Mark Conway replaced Sanderson as editor.

In June 2023, former reporter Rodney Edwards was appointed editor of the newspaper.
