= Slugger O'Toole =

Weblog on Northern Ireland by Mick Fealty

Slugger O'Toole is a weblog started in June 2002 by political analyst Mick Fealty. It began life as Letter to Slugger O'Toole, focused primarily on news and comment about Northern Ireland and drawning its readership from a wide spectrum of opinion both inside and outside Northern Ireland.

"Slugger's" contributors are from a range of political perspectives, including those with links to all of the main political parties as well as a number of 'independents'. Research commissioned in the summer of 2008 by Stratagem in association with ComRes revealed that 96% of the members of the Northern Ireland Assembly (MLAs) read the blog "regularly" or "occasionally".

As of 2023 the site has published over 40,000 posts and over one and a half million comments. Each month the site gets about 70,000 readers. The site is run by volunteers and has never had any paid staff. The site is reader supported and does not get any funding.

== Play the ball, not the man/woman rule ==
The site has a fairly rigorous comments policy in which personal abuse is discouraged and commenters are urged to 'play the ball and not the man' - a refrain that has since been popularised in the wider Irish political discourse. The phrase refers to Ad hominem argument. The phrase was first suggested by early commentator Ian Parsley in 2003.

== Origins of the name ==
The name of the blog was originally a reference to a sockpuppet character invented by Tim Murphy of New York, on an old CNN community called Peace in Northern Ireland. The name of the character is in turn a reference to the traditional Irish song "The Irish Rover", best known from a version recorded as a collaboration between The Pogues and The Dubliners. The relevant line is: There was Slugger O'Toole who was drunk as a rule. Murphy's "character" was invariably drunk on Bushmills, never listened to reasoned argument, and usually espoused strong loyalist politics, which often caught the unwary or recently arrived off guard.

The idea of the Letter was to try to explain the complexities of Northern Ireland, slowly, regularly and in short bite-size pieces over a long, long period of time. Just like trying to explain something complex to a drunk man.

However, the Letter part was dropped when the blog moved from its old blogspot venue and radically re-designed and built on a different blog platform.

== The Slugger O'Toole Political Awards ==
In the autumn of 2008, Slugger O'Toole announced a series of political awards. With the stated intention of 'promoting a conversational politics', the awards sought to identify good examples of democratic practice.

The inaugural awards were presented in Belfast on 7 October 2008 with comedian Tim McGarry as compere.

The 2008 winners were as follows:

- MLA of the year: Naomi Long MLA
- Up and coming politician: Daithi McKay MLA
- Journalism Award: David Gordon
- Representatives external to Northern Ireland: The Rt Hon. Peter Robinson MP, MLA
- Local Council of the Year: Belfast City Council
- Local Newspaper of the Year: The Impartial Reporter
- Councillor of the year: Deirdre Nelson
- Committee Chair of the year: Danny Kennedy MLA
- Political blogger of the year: Nevin Taggart (NALIL)
- Jobsworth Award: Assembly Commission.

The 2009 awards were scheduled to take place on 24 November at The Black Box in Belfast. The 2010 awards were going to see a change in format.

== Awards ==
- In March 2012, Slugger made the longlist for the blog section of the Orwell Prize.
- Winner the Peace Through Media Award 2009
- Shortlisted for Politics Online's "The Top 10 Who Are Changing the World of Internet and Politics" 2006 and 2009.
- "Best Website of the Month" and specially commended in the "Website of the Year Award" at the BT GoldenEye T Awards in May 2006.
- First in the "Best Political Blog" section in the Dublin based Irish Blog Awards in 2006.
- In 2005 it won "Best European Political Weblog" in the first Satin Pajamas competition held by A Fistful of Euros.
- It won the New Statesman "New Media Award" for community and information in 2004.
