= Two Jamaican Pieces =

Suite by Arthur Benjamin

Two Jamaican Pieces is a short suite composed in 1938 by Arthur Benjamin which uses melodies from the West Indies.

It is in two sections, Jamaican Song and Jamaican Rumba. The latter has become Benjamin's most popular work. The suite was initially written for the duo-pianists Joan Trimble and her sister Valerie Trimble (Joan was Benjamin's student). Benjamin also arranged it for orchestra.

Larry Adler recorded a version in 1959 on Pye Records.
