= The Devil Take Her =

1931 opera by Arthur Benjamin

The Devil Take Her is an opera in one act by Arthur Benjamin to an original English libretto by Alan Collard and John Gordon. Its first performance was Royal College of Music, London, 1931. The premiere production starred tenor Trefor Jones and soprano Sarah Fischer and was conducted by Thomas Beecham. Its first American performance was in New York in 1941.

The opera is set in 15th century London. A man is married to a woman who has not been able to speak since birth. A surgeon arrives who gives her the ability to speak, but once the wife can speak she becomes bad tempered and domineering. Exasperated the husband calls for the Devil to take her, but when the Devil arrives he too cannot bear the wife. The opera ends with the husband and devil escaping together from the wife.

== 1962 television version ==
The opera was filmed for Australian television by the ABC in 1962 with Marie Tysoe directed by Robert Allnut.

== Sources ==
- The Devil Take Her on Boosey & Hawkes
