= Roger Doucet =

Canadian opera singer

Roger Doucet, CM
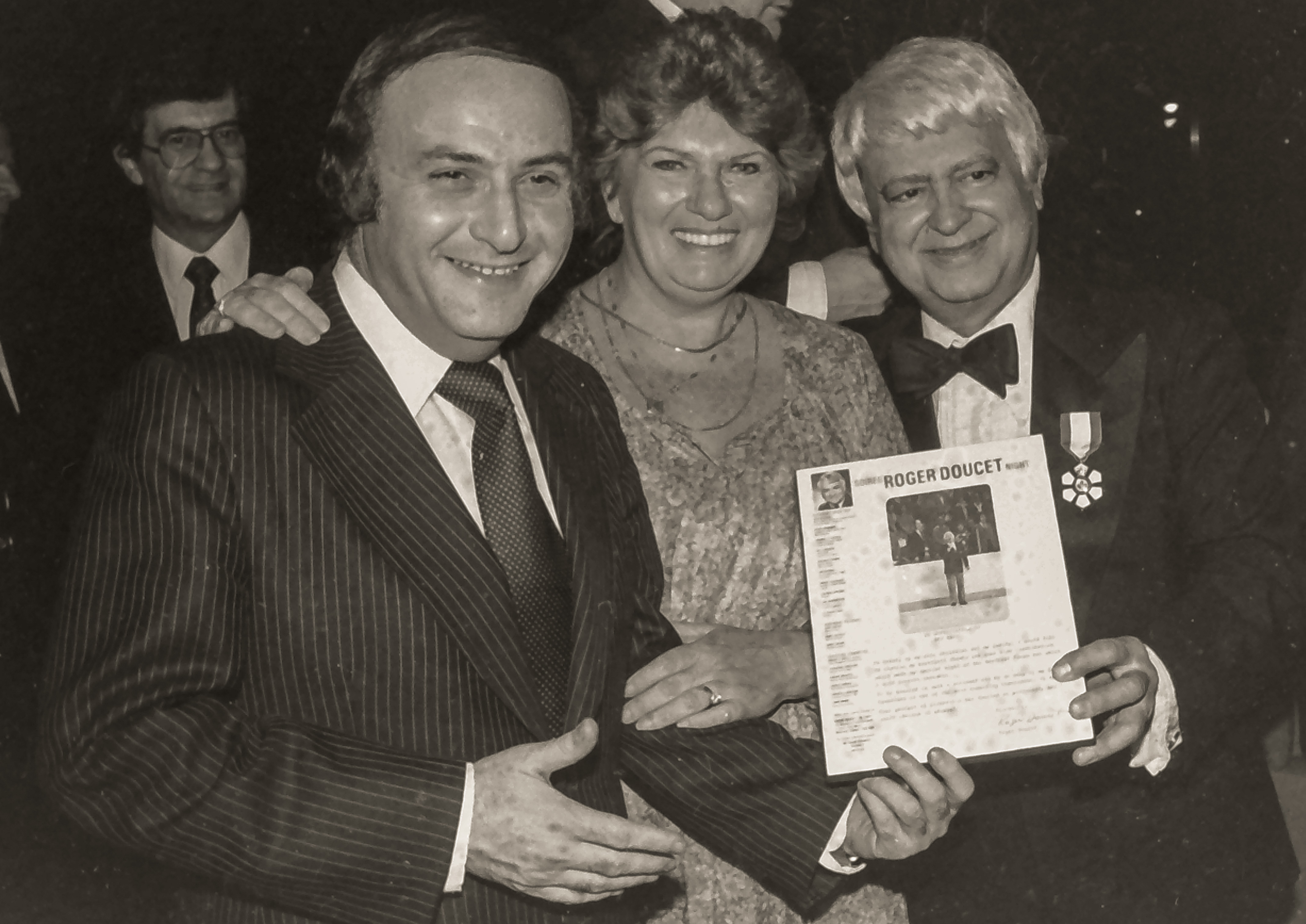
- Roger Doucet (right) in 1980

Background information
- Born: 21 April 1919; Montreal, Quebec, Canada
- Died: 19 July 1981 (aged 62) Montreal, Quebec, Canada
- Occupation: singer
- Instrument: Voice
- Years active: 1941–1981

Roger Doucet CM (21 April 1919 – 19 July 1981) was a Canadian tenor best known for singing the Canadian national anthem, "O Canada", at televised games of the Montreal Canadiens, Montreal Alouettes, and Montreal Expos during the 1970s. He was particularly known for his bilingual version of the anthem, which began in French and ended in English, in recognition of the two languages of Canada.

== Career ==
Doucet studied singing with Sarah Fischer. His first performance of the national anthem at a Canadiens game was on 13 October 1970. Author Andrew Podnieks noted that Doucet "belted the anthem with an enthusiasm that energized the crowd as much as any Lafleur slapper or Robinson hip check."

During the inaugural Canada Cup tournament, Doucet was scheduled to sing the national anthems at a game between Czechoslovakia and the Soviet Union on 3 September 1976. However, the lyrics for "Hymn of the Soviet Union" were omitted since the mid-1950s due to their Stalinist content. Doucet consulted with the Université de Montréal's Russian department staff who provided a modified anthem to sing at the game.

Doucet also changed the way Canadians sing their anthem. Before Doucet, the final "we stand on guard for Thee" was universally sung the way it was written: fa-mi-re-soh-ti-doh, with the 'ti' and the 'doh' falling. Doucet sang the final 'ti-doh' by raising these notes an octave above their traditional pitch. The audience of CBC's Hockey Night in Canada was so vast, and his rendition so powerful, that within a few years Doucet's version became—and remains — the accepted way to conclude O Canada.

In 1980, he was made a Member of the Order of Canada, Canada's highest civilian honour, "in recognition for the feeling of pride he has instilled in his fellow citizens".

Roger Doucet died in Montreal on 19 July 1981 from brain cancer.

== Legacy ==
American sportswriter Paul Zimmerman (Dr. Z) remembered as a highlight of his coverage of Canadiens games that Doucet "[b]rought the house down. I mean, people would cry when he finished that song. And it never ran longer than 47 or 48 seconds."

In the Montreal Canadiens home opener for the 2020–21 NHL season, the Canadiens put together a compilation of some of the famous anthem singers they have had starting with Roger Doucet and ending with Ginette Reno.
