= Prima Donna (film) =

- Based on: opera Prima Donna by Arthur Benjamin
- Directed by: Alan Burke
- Country of origin: Australia
- Original language: English

Production
- Running time: 60 mins

Original release
- Network: ABC
- Release: 28 January 1959 (live, Sydney)
- Release: 5 March 1959 (recording, Melbourne)

Prima Donna is a 1959 television play broadcast by the Australian Broadcasting Corporation. It was an adaptation of an opera by Arthur Benjamin and was directed by Alan Burke. It was the first of several operas Burke would direct.

== Cast ==
- Valda Bagnall
- Geoffrey Chard
- Alan Ferris
- Rosalind Keene
- Alan Light
- Marie Tysoe

== Production ==
The play went for one hour and Burke only had nine hours of rehearsal. Burke later recalled:

In 1959 I was allowed to do my first opera, The Prima Donna by Arthur Benjamin This was a live opera, with the orchestra conducted by Joe Post, who was Head of ABC Music. The rehearsal schedule was made out for me. It allowed 3 calls of 3 hours each. I went to see Joe Post to check this relatively short time allocation and he said "Isn't it enough time to tell them where to stand?" Joe Post was a radio person - he hated television. This opera was done in the days when we had the Symphony Orchestra in the studio. One day Joe Post stopped the orchestra and called out "Mr. Burke, those boys are taking close-ups again". I thought 'What can we do?' I said "Forgive me Mr. Post, the reason they are taking close ups is because I have plotted close ups for them". Then I gave him a five minute course on television. So he seemed to accept this.

Marie Tysoe later recalled:

That was conducted by Joseph Post. This was done live and we had a lot of trouble to see the conductor and also to please the producer with the camera positions. The orchestra was in the studio as well. It was easy to get out of sync if we did not see the conductor. It was very crowded in the studio.

== See also ==
- List of live television plays broadcast on Australian Broadcasting Corporation (1950s)
