= Joan Trimble =

Irish composer and pianist

Joan Trimble (18 June 1915 – 6 August 2000) was an Irish composer and pianist from Ulster. She studied at the Royal Irish Academy of Music and the Royal College of Music in London, and she and her sister performed for many years as a piano duo. In later years she inherited her father's newspaper, becoming its proprietor and editor.

== Early life ==
Joan Trimble was born in Enniskillen, County Fermanagh (now Northern Ireland). Joan grew up in a musical household. Her mother was Marie Dowse, a solo violinist from a Dublin family of musicians, from which all eleven children had attended the Royal Irish Academy of Music. Her father was William Egbert Trimble, a bass-baritone and a noted collector of folksong. He was also the proprietor of The Impartial Reporter, one of Ulster's regional newspapers. Joan attended Enniskillen Royal School for Girls and was the school's first Head Girl. In 1931, Joan and her sister Valerie (1917–1980) commenced studies at the Royal Irish Academy of Music in Dublin.

Joan studied composition with John F. Larchet and won a scholarship to the University of Dublin, from where she graduated with a BA degree in 1936. She was awarded piano, violin and composition scholarships and studied piano with Annie Lord and music at Trinity College Dublin (BA 1936, BMus 1937). In 1936, the tenor John McCormack chose her to play piano solos during one of his tours. She moved to London and joined her sister at the Royal College of Music, where her mentor was the Australian composer and pianist Arthur Benjamin. She also studied composition there with Herbert Howells and Ralph Vaughan Williams.

In June 1942 in London, Joan Trimble married John Greenwood Gant, a Royal Army Medical Corps officer, with whom she had a son and two daughters.

== Career ==
Joan composed a total of twenty-four works in a creative career of twenty years, including Buttermilk Point (1938), settings of Irish folksong (1939-40), the Sonatina for Two Pianos (1940), The Heather Glen (1949), and a Suite for Strings (1951). Her Phantasy for Piano trio (1940), which she wrote at the suggestion of Vaughan Williams, won the Cobbett Prize for chamber music and the Sullivan Prize for composition. The County Mayo (1949) was an unusual combination of two pianos and baritone voice, a suggestion from the singer Robert Irwin. Commissions for the BBC included Ulster Airs (1939–40) for the BBC Northern Ireland Orchestra, and Erin Go Bragh, a march-rhapsody for brass band (1943). Her setting for voice and orchestra, How Dear to Me the Hour, won the Radio Éireann Centenary Prize in 1953.

In 1957, the BBC commissioned an opera from her, and she chose the 1924 Blind Raftery by Donn Byrne, the story of a wandering Irish bard set in the west of Ireland in the 17th century. She asked Cedric Cliffe, who had worked with Arthur Benjamin, to write the libretto. It was the second opera commissioned by the BBC for television, and it was the first television opera written by a female composer

Between 1959 and 1977, Trimble was professor of accompaniment and musicianship at the Royal College of Music.

=== Piano duo ===
Trimble first gained notice performing with her sister Valerie in a piano duo, which won first prize at a Belfast music competition in 1925. Joan later composed works for two pianos which they performed together, including the Sonatina (1940). The sisters gave their first professional recital as a duo in the evening of September 28, 1938, at the Royal College of Music in London, as war was about to be declared with Germany. One of their audience said he had come to hear them "as it might be the last music he would ever hear." They performed three of Joan's new compositions, Buttermilk Point, The Bard Of Lisgoole and The Humours of Carrick, Arnold Bax's Irish tone-poem for two pianos, Moy Mell, and the four-hand Jamaican Rumba, which had been composed for them by Arthur Benjamin for their debut performance. It was Benjamin who had encouraged Joan and her sister, whose principal instrument was the cello, to play piano together, and this piece became their signature tune.

During World War II, the sisters worked as volunteer nurses for the Red Cross in London and were regular performers on the BBC, at Dame Myra Hess's National Gallery lunchtime concerts and at the BBC's promenade concerts. The first of their many Prom appearances was in 1943, and their piano duets were broadcast for many years in the weekly BBC radio series 'Tuesday Serenade'. Their repertoire was wide and included Arnold Cooke, Dallapiccola, Kenneth Leighton, Stravinsky, and they premièred the two-piano concertos of Arthur Bliss and Lennox Berkeley. In the early 1950s, they gave the British première of one of Mendelssohn's concertos for two pianos, the A-flat, and continued to perform in public until 1970.

=== Honours ===
Trimble was honoured by the Royal College of Music in 1960 and by Queen's University Belfast in 1983. From 1981 to 1985 she was on the board of Ulster Television, and from 1983 to 1988 she was a member of the advisory committee of the Arts Council of Northern Ireland. In 1985 she received the rarely-bestowed fellowship of the Royal Irish Academy of Music. Also in 1985, BBC Radio 3 broadcast a concert to celebrate her 70th birthday, which included the first performance since 1957 of her composition for baritone and two pianos, The County Mayo.

In 1990, the Arts Council of Northern Ireland commissioned Three Diversions for Wind Quintet from her for her 75th birthday.

=== Musical style ===
Joan Trimble's music was conservative for her time. She had a deep and scholarly interest in Irish traditional music and there was an innate Irish quality to her writing. Her work combined the Impressionist harmonic language she had learned since her studies with Annie Lord with melodic and rhythmic inflections derived from Irish traditional music. Her arrangements of Irish traditional airs for two pianos did not differ stylistically from her original compositions. She said that she wrote her music with regard neither to schools nor period. "Shape and form, rhythm and clarity, as well as freedom of expression, are all important. I am free to be myself regardless of fashion." The Irish idiom which informed her distinctive style gave her music a rhythmic and rhapsodic quality, and her compositions conveyed something of the colour and clarity of French music.

== Later life and death ==
After the death of her father in 1967, she became managing director of the family firm. She also took over the running of his newspaper, The Impartial Reporter, in Enniskillen, the fourth generation of her family to do so. She remained its proprietor and editor until her death, when she was succeeded by her daughter.

She was an active managing director, commuting from 1967 to 1977 between London, where she was teaching, and Enniskillen. She became involved in local journalism and wrote for the paper, including a weekly column devoted to the history of the district. In 1977, she retired from her position at the Royal College of Music to concentrate on the Reporter.

In the 1990s, she was commissioned for a new composition and the first recordings of her music appeared. She died in Enniskillen on 6 August 2000, at the age of 85, two weeks after the death of her husband.

== Legacy ==
In 2002, the Joan Trimble Awards Scheme was established by her family in her memory, and administered by the Fermanagh Trust "in recognition of her lifelong commitment to County Fermanagh". The purpose of the scheme was to encourage and support the involvement of young people in creativity, the performing arts and Irish culture, and to provide bursaries for training and education.

In 2012, Fermanagh County Museum staged an exhibition titled "Buttermilk Point: The Musical Life of Joan Trimble, 1915–2000".

On 18 June 2015, "Music in Fermanagh" presented A Celebration Concert as part of the Joan Trimble Centenary Celebration at the Ardhowen Theatre in Enniskillen.

== Works ==
Opera

- Blind Raftery, television opera in two scenes (BBC, May 1957)

Orchestra

- 15 Ulster Airs (arrangements of trad. tunes, 1939–40)
- In Glenade for string orchestra (1942)
- Suite for Strings for string orchestra (1951)

Chamber Music

- The Coolin (Irish air) (1939) for cello & piano. London: Hawkes & Son, c.1939.
- Phantasy Trio (1940) for violin, cello, piano
- The Pool among the Rushes (1941) for clarinet & piano
- Erin go Bragh (1943) for brass band
- Introduction and Air (1969) for two harps. Cork: Mercier Press, 1969 (in The Irish Harp Book ed. by Sheila Larchet-Cuthbert).
- Three Diversions (1990) for wind quintet

Music for two pianos

- The Humours of Carrick (1938). London: Winthrop Rogers, c.1938.
- The Bard of Lisgoole (1938)
- Buttermilk Point (1938). London: Winthrop Rogers, c.1939.
- Sonatina (1940). London: Winthrop Rogers, 1941.
- The Green Bough (1941). London: Boosey & Hawkes, 1951.
- Pastorale (Hommage à F. Poulenc) (1943)
- The Gartan Mother's Lullaby (1949). London: Boosey & Co., 1949.
- The Heather Glen (1949). London: Boosey & Co., 1949.
- Puck Fair (1951)

Songs

- My Grief on the Sea (Douglas Hyde) (1937)
- Girl's Song (Wilfrid Wilson Gibson) (1937)
- Green Rain (Mary Webb) (1937). London: Winthrop Rogers, 1938.
- The County Mayo, song cycle (James Stephens) (1949)

== Recordings ==
- Celtic Keyboards: Duets by Irish Composers, performed by Bruce Posner & Donald Garvelmann (pianos), on: Koch International Classics 3-7287-2 H1 (CD, 1994). Contains: Sonatina, The Gartan Mother's Lullaby, The Heather Glen, The Bard of Lisgoole, Buttermilk Point, The Green Bough, The Humours of Carrick.
- Silver Apples of the Moon – Irish Classical Music, performed by Irish Chamber Orchestra, Fionnuala Hunt (cond.), on: Black Box Music BBM 1003 (CD, 1997). Contains: Suite for Strings.
- Joan Trimble: Two Pianos – Songs and Chamber Music, performed by Patricia Bardon (mezzo), Joe Corbett (baritone), Una Hunt (piano), Roy Holmes (piano), Dublin Piano Trio, on: Marco Polo 8.225059 (CD, 1999). Contains: The Cows are a-milking, A Gartan Mother's Lullaby, The Heather Glen, My Grief on the Sea, Green Rain, Girl's Song, Sonatina, Pastorale (Hommage à F. Poulenc), Phantasy Trio, Puck Fair, The Green Bough, The County Mayo, Buttermilk Point, The Bard of Lisgoole, The Humours of Carrick.
- Phantasy Trio, performed by Fidelio Trio, on: RTÉ lyric fm CD 153 (CD, 2016).
- The Pool Among the Rushes, performed by John Finucane (clarinet) and Elisaveta Blumina (piano), on: Genuin GEN 18495 (CD, 2018).
- Green Rain; Girl's Song; My Grief on the Sea, performed by Carolyn Dobbin (mezzo) & Iain Burnside (piano), on: Delphian Records DCD 34187 (CD, 2018).
- Songs from the North of Ireland, Delphian DCD34329 (2024)

== General references ==
- Philip Hammond: "Woman of Parts: Joan Trimble", in: Soundpost 5 (1984–85), p. 24–7.
- "Joan Trimble", in: Contemporary Music Review 9 (1994), pp. 277–84.
- Axel Klein: Die Musik Irlands im 20. Jahrhundert (Hildesheim: Georg Olms, 1996).
- Lisa McCarroll: The Celtic Twilight as Reflected in the Two-Piano Works of Joan Trimble (1915–2000) (DMA dissertation, Moores School of Music, University of Houston, 2013).
- Ruth Stanley: Joan Trimble (1915–2000) and the Issue of her 'Irish' Musical Identity (MA thesis, Mary Immaculate College, University of Limerick, 2003; unpublished).
- Alasdair Jamieson: "Trimble, Joan" and "Trimble, Valerie", in: The Encyclopaedia of Music in Ireland, ed. by Harry White & Barra Boydell (Dublin: UCD Press, 2013), pp. 1008–09.
- Alasdair Jamieson: Music in Northern Ireland. Two Major Figures: Havelock Nelson (1917–1996) and Joan Trimble (1915–2000) (Tolworth, Surrey: Grosvenor House Publishing, 2017); ISBN 978-1-78623-977-8.
