= Storm Clouds Cantata =

Cantata by Arthur Benjamin

The Storm Clouds Cantata (or Storm Cloud Cantata) is a cantata by the Australian composer Arthur Benjamin.

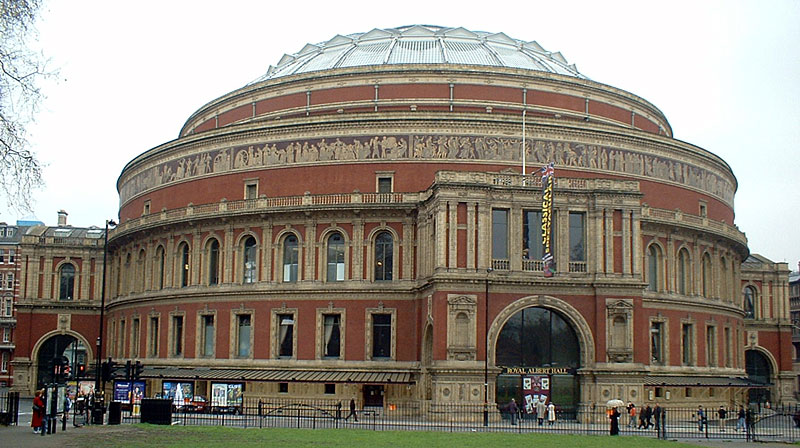
The Royal Albert Hall, the scene of the "Storm Clouds Cantata" in both versions

This cantata was written for the assassination scene in the Alfred Hitchcock 1934 film, The Man Who Knew Too Much, in the Royal Albert Hall. In the film version of 1934, the London Symphony Orchestra was directed by H. Wynn Reeves. In the 1956 version, however, the London Symphony Orchestra was conducted by Bernard Herrmann, the composer of new music for the remake, and the chorus is the Covent Garden Opera Chorus with soloist Barbara Howitt.

The cantata is 177 measures and runs 8–9 minutes. It starts with a lento in three-quarter time in C major. Then begins the allegro agitato, characterized by rhythmic strokes of the timpani. The conclusion is presto.

== Instrumentation ==
The work is scored for SATB chorus plus a mezzo-soprano soloist, with an orchestra consisting of 3 flutes (3rd doubling piccolo), 2 oboes, 2 clarinets, 2 bassoons, 4 horns, 3 trumpets, 3 trombones, tuba, timpani, 4 percussion (snare drum, bass drum, cymbals), organ, 2 harps, and strings.

== Text ==
The libretto of the cantata was written by D. B. Wyndham-Lewis. This appears to be his only actual contribution to the screenplay, although he is credited as co-author.

Soloist:

There came a whispered terror on the breeze.
And the dark forest shook

Chorus:

And on the trembling trees came nameless fear.
And panic overtook each flying creature of the wild

Original: ...flying creature of the wind

And when they all had fled

Soloist:

All save the child — all save the child.
Around whose head screaming,
The night-birds wheeled and shot away.

Chorus:

Finding release from that which drove them onward like their prey.
Finding release the storm-clouds broke.
And drowned the dying moon.
The storm-clouds broke — the storm clouds broke.
Finding release!

=== Addition for the 1956 remake ===
Yet stood the trees — yet stood the trees
Around whose heads screaming

The singers perform in an alternation between male and female:

Finding release;
Finding release from that which drove them onward like their prey.

This last part is part of the poco crescendo played by the timpani to culminate in the Maestoso in the finale which ends with the cymbal crash in which the assassin shoots.

== Publication ==
Neither the full nor the vocal score of the Storm Clouds Cantata has ever been published. A piano arrangement of the latter half of the work was published in 2014 in the collection Music From the Hitchcock Films.

== Recording ==
A recording of the complete 1954 version [i.e. with Herrmann's embellishments] is included on the CD Elmer Bernstein conducts the Royal Philharmonic Orchestra: Bernard Herrmann Film Scores - from Citizen Kane to Taxi Driver (1992).

== See also ==
- Alfred Hitchcock
- The Man Who Knew Too Much (1934)
- The Man Who Knew Too Much (1956)
- Royal Albert Hall
- London Symphony Orchestra
- Bernard Herrmann
