= D. B. Wyndham Lewis =

British journalist, author and biographer (1891–1969)

- Born: Llewellyn Bevan Wyndham Lewis; 9 March 1891; Seaforth, England
- Died: 21 November 1969 (aged 78)
- Other name: Timothy Shy
- Occupations: Author and journalist
- Spouses: Winifred Mary (Jane) Holland, Dorothy Anne Robertson
- Children: 3

Dominic Bevan Wyndham Lewis FRSL (9 March 1891 – 21 November 1969) was a British journalist, author and biographer, known for his humorous newspaper articles.

== Life and works ==
Born Llewellyn Bevan Wyndham Lewis to a family of Welsh origin then living in Seaforth, he dropped his first name and replaced it with "Dominic" following his conversion to Roman Catholicism in 1921. After schooling in Cardiff, he served in the Welch Regiment during World War I. He twice suffered from shell-shock while serving in France and contracted malaria on being assigned to Macedonia. On 29 October 1918, Lewis married Winifred Mary (Jane) Holland, with whom he had one daughter, the future actress Angela Wyndham Lewis. The couple divorced in 1926 and in July 1933 Lewis married Dorothy Anne Robertson, with whom he had two sons.

Lewis had originally intended to take up a legal career, but after the war he decided on journalism and joined the Daily Express, where he was briefly the newspaper's Literary Editor. In 1919 he was put in charge of the paper's humorous 'By the Way' column, using the pen name Beachcomber, originated by his predecessor. A selection of these was published as At the Green Goose in 1923. From there he moved on to the Daily Mail, where he contributed a column called 'At the Sign of the Blue Moon', selections from which were published in 1924 and 1925.

Lewis lived in Paris from the mid-1920s while doing historical research for his entertaining biography of François Villon. Later biographies of French subjects included Louis XI, the Emperor Charles V, Ronsard, Molière, Rabelais and Gilles de Rais. He also wrote works on Boswell, Goya and Cervantes.

After returning to Britain, Lewis published as 'Mustard and Cress' in the Sunday Referee until 1935 and then returned as a columnist to the Daily Mail, and later a decade-long column as Timothy Shy for the News Chronicle. In addition, he co-wrote, with Charles Bennett, the screenplay for the first version of Alfred Hitchcock's The Man Who Knew Too Much (1934). He also supplied the lyrics for the Storm Clouds Cantata, featured in the film's climatic Albert Hall scene. This was followed by various other British film scripts during the 1930s.

Lewis also made a name for himself as a compiler of the facetious anthology The Stuffed Owl, co-edited with Charles Lee in 1930. A collection of 'good Bad Verse', it featured excerpts from well-known authors at considerably less than their best as well as many others now forgotten. This was followed in 1936 by The Nonsensibus, "driven by D. B. Wyndham Lewis". In 1952 he collaborated with Ronald Searle on The Terror of St Trinian's (under the pen name 'Timothy Shy').

Though he was often confused with his contemporary, the painter and author Percy Wyndham Lewis, they were not related.

== Books written or edited by D. B. Wyndham Lewis ==
- A London Farrago (London, 1922)
- At the Green Goose (Beachcomber columns, London, 1923)
- At the Sign of the Blue Moon (Daily Mail columns, London 1924)
- At the Blue Moon Again, (Daily Mail columns, New York 1924, London 1925)
- On Straw, and Other Conceits (Daily Mail columns, London 1927, New York 1929)
- François Villon: A Documented Survey (London and New York, 1928)
- King Spider: Some Aspects of Louis XI of France and His Companions (New York 1929, London 1930)
- The Stuffed Owl: An Anthology of Bad Verse, edited with Charles Lee (London 1930; enlarged 1948)
- Welcome to All This (Daily Mail pieces and others, London 1931)
- A Christmas Book: An Anthology for Moderns, edited with GC Heseltine (London 1931)
- Emperor of the West: A Study of Charles the Fifth (London 1932; published in New York 1931 as Charles of Europe)
- The Nonsensibus, an anthology 'driven by D.B. Wyndham Lewis' (London 1936)
- Beyond the Headlines (as Timothy Shy, articles from the News Chronicle, London 1941)
- I Couldn't Help Laughing!: An Anthology of War-time Humour (London 1941, second edition 1942, enlarged edition 1943)
- Take It to Bed, (selections from the Tatler and the Bystander, London 1944)
- Ronsard (London and New York, 1944)
- The Hooded Hawk: or, The Case of Mr. Boswell (London 1946, New York 1947; reissued as James Boswell, A Short Life, London 1952)
- Four Favourites (Mme de Pompadour, Melbourne, Godoy, Potemkin; London 1948, New York 1949)
- The Soul of Marshal Gilles de Raiz (London 1952)
- The Terror of St Trinians (as Timothy Shy, with Ronald Searle, London 1952)
- Doctor Rabelais (London and New York, 1957)
- A Florentine Portrait: St Philip Benizi 1233-85 (London and New York, 1959)
- Molière: The Comic Mask (London and New York, 1959)
- The Shadow of Cervantes (London and New York, 1962)
- The World of Goya (London and New York, 1968)
