= Arthur Benjamin =

Australian composer, pianist, conductor and teacher (1893–1960)

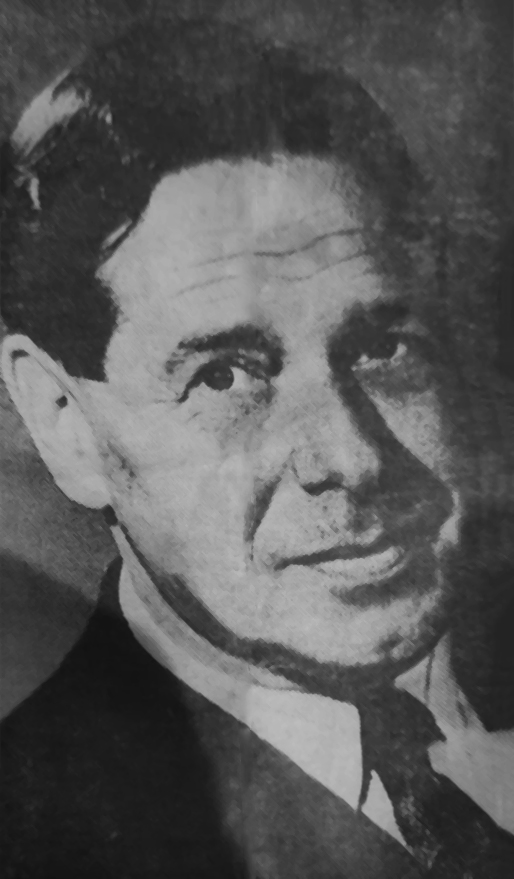
- Born: 18 September 1893; Sydney, New South Wales, Australia
- Died: 10 April 1960 (aged 66); London, England, United Kingdom
- Known for: Music composition

Arthur Leslie Benjamin (September 18, 1893 – April 10, 1960) was an Australian composer, pianist, conductor and teacher. He is best known as the composer of Jamaican Rumba (1938) and of the Storm Clouds Cantata, featured in both versions of the Alfred Hitchcock film The Man who Knew Too Much, in 1934 and 1956.

== Early life and war ==
Arthur Benjamin was born in Sydney on 18 September 1893 into a Jewish family, although he was a non-practicing Jew. His parents moved to Brisbane when Arthur was three years old. At the age of six, he made his first public appearance as a pianist and his formal musical training began three years later with George Sampson, the Organist of St John's Cathedral and Brisbane City Organist. In 1911, Benjamin won a scholarship from Brisbane Grammar School to the Royal College of Music (RCM), where he studied composition with Charles Villiers Stanford, harmony and counterpoint with Thomas Dunhill, and piano with Frederic Cliffe.

In 1914, he joined the Officer Training Corps, receiving a temporary commission in April 1915. He served initially in the infantry, as 2nd Lieutenant with the 32nd Battalion of the Royal Fusiliers and, in November 1917, he transferred to the Royal Flying Corps as a gunner. On 31 July 1918, his aircraft was shot down over Germany by the young Hermann Göring, and Benjamin spent the remainder of the war as a German prisoner of war at Ruhleben internment camp near Berlin. There he met the composer Edgar Bainton, who had been interned since 1914, and who was later to become director of the New South Wales State Conservatorium of Music.

== Performer, teacher, adjudicator ==
Returning to Australia in 1919 Benjamin became piano professor at the New South Wales State Conservatorium of Music in Sydney. But by 1921 he was in England to teach piano at the Royal College of Music. Following his appointment in 1926 to a professorship at the RCM, which he held for the next thirteen years, Benjamin developed a distinguished career as a piano teacher. His better-known students from that era include Muir Mathieson, Peggy Glanville-Hicks, Miriam Hyde, Joan Trimble, Stanley Bate, Bernard Stevens, Lamar Crowson, Alun Hoddinott, Dorian Le Gallienne, Natasha Litvin (later Stephen Spender's wife and a prominent concert pianist), William Blezard and Benjamin Britten, whose Holiday Diary suite for solo piano is dedicated to Benjamin and mimics many of his teacher's mannerisms. See: List of music students by teacher: A to B#Arthur Benjamin.

Benjamin was also an adjudicator and examiner for the Associated Board of the Royal Schools of Music, which led him to places such as Australia, Canada and the West Indies. It was in the West Indies that he discovered the native tune, Mango Walk, on which he based his best-known piece, Jamaican Rumba, one of Two Jamaican Pieces composed in 1938, for which the Jamaican government gave him a free barrel of rum a year as thanks for making their country known. In 1945, a shortened piano solo arrangement of the Jamaican Rumba was published.

=== Premieres as pianist ===
Arthur Benjamin gave a number of important premieres including:

- Herbert Howells' Piano Concerto No. 1 (1913)
- Arthur Bliss's suite Masks for solo piano by (2 February 1926)
- Constant Lambert's Concerto for piano and 9 players (18 December 1931, Lambert conducting)

== Canada ==
Benjamin resigned from his post at the RCM and left to settle in Vancouver, British Columbia, Canada, where he remained for the duration of the war. In 1941, he was appointed conductor of the newly formed CBR Symphony Orchestra, holding the post until 1946. During that time he gave "literally hundreds" of Canadian first performances. After a series of radio talks and concerts in addition to music teaching, conducting and composing, he became a major figure in Canadian musical life. He frequently visited the United States, broadcasting and arranging many performances of contemporary British music. He was also resident lecturer at Reed College, Portland, Oregon between 1944 and 1945, where notable students include composer Pamela Harrison and John Carmichael. While in Canada, Benjamin had a keen interest in the visual arts, and was credited with arranging the first museum exhibition for the young Russian/Canadian artist Eric Freifeld at the Vancouver Art Gallery in 1940.

== Death ==
Arthur Benjamin was honoured by the Worshipful Company of Musicians by the award of the Cobbett Medal in 1957. He died on 10 April 1960, at the age of 66, at the Middlesex Hospital, London, from a re-occurrence of the cancer that had first attacked him three years earlier. An alternative explanation of the immediate cause of death is hepatitis, contracted while Benjamin and his partner, Jack Henderson, a Canadian who worked in the music publishing business, were holidaying with the Australian painter Donald Friend in Ceylon (now Sri Lanka).

=== Tributes from other composers ===
Herbert Howells wrote an orchestral suite The Bs, in five movements, each celebrating a close friend. The work was first performed in 1914, and ends with an heraldic march movement entitled "Benjee", saluting Arthur Benjamin, who the previous year had given the premiere of Howells' Piano Concerto No. 1. Howells' orchestral piece Procession (written for the 1922 Proms) is dedicated to Benjamin. Benjamin, in turn, later dedicated the three-page Saxophone Blues (1929) to Howells.

The Australian pianist and composer, Ian Munro, who has a special affinity with Arthur Benjamin and has recorded many of his piano works, has written a short biography of Benjamin.

== Composition ==
As Howells observed, Benjamin was often dismissed by serious critics due to the widespread popularity of his brief novelty piece Jamaican Rumba, and also because he was "an unabashed Romantic", which made him appear an anachronistic figure. Hans Keller, who had identified much the same problem a decade earlier, highlighted the successful assimilation of "modern moods and methods" that enabled him to compose "light music that is not slight, and serious music which renounces depth without risking shallowness".

=== Orchestral works ===
Orchestral works became more common after 1927: Rhapsody on Negro Themes (MS 1919); Concertino for piano and orchestra (1926/7); Light Music Suite (1928); Overture to an Italian Comedy (1937) and Cotillon, A Suite of Dance Tunes (1938) are examples. The Violin Concerto (1932) was premiered by Antonio Brosa, with Benjamin conducting the BBC Symphony Orchestra, and was praised by Constant Lambert and Ernest Newman. Benjamin's Romantic Fantasy for Violin, Viola and Orchestra was premiered by Eda Kersey and Bernard Shore in 1938, under the composer. Its first recording was by Jascha Heifetz and William Primrose.

The Elegiac Mazurka of 1941 was commissioned as part of the memorial volume "Homage to Paderewski" in honour of the Polish pianist who had died that year. Benjamin's wartime Symphony (1945) was (said Benjamin) "intended to mirror the feelings - the despairs and hopes - of the time in which I live". It was dedicated to Vaughan Williams and is "the most weighty and extended of all his orchestral compositions, and one which reveals him as a considerable musical thinker and master of form". The premiere was given by the Hallé Orchestra conducted by John Barbirolli at the Cheltenham Festival on 30 June 1948.

The ballet Orlando's Silver Wedding appeared in 1951. The Harmonica Concerto (1953) was written for Larry Adler who performed it many times and recorded it at least twice.

=== Chamber music ===
The manuscript of the unpublished violin sonata in E minor bears the date 1918, the only surviving work of that year and one of very few to be written by Benjamin during the first war. Benjamin continued writing chamber works for the next few years: Three Pieces for violin and piano (1919–24); Three Impressions (voice and string quartet, 1919); Five Pieces for Cello (1923); Pastoral Fantasy (string quartet, 1924) (which won a Carnegie Award that year), and a Sonatina for violin and piano (1924) which was recorded by Frederick Grinke in 1955.

In 1935, Benjamin accompanied the 10-year-old Canadian cellist Lorne Munroe on a concert tour of Europe. Three years later he wrote a Sonatina for Munroe, who later became the principal cellist with the Philadelphia Orchestra and the New York Philharmonic, and also recorded the piece.

Other chamber works include the Tombeau de Ravel for clarinet and piano, a second string quartet (1959), and the Wind Quintet (1960). He had a lasting admiration for Maurice Ravel, whose influence is most obvious in Tombeau de Ravel and the much earlier suite of 1926 for piano solo. He also produced over twenty meticulously crafted songs and choral settings.

=== Opera ===
Benjamin wrote four operas. The one-act opera The Devil Take Her, to a libretto by Alan Collard and John B. Gordon, was first produced at the RCM on 1 December 1931, conducted by Sir Thomas Beecham. Another one-acter, Prima Donna (1932) had to wait until 23 February 1949 for its premiere, at the Fortune Theatre in London. Its libretto was by Cedric Cliffe, son of Benjamin's piano teacher at the RCM, Frederic Cliffe. Both musicals were filmed for television by the Australian Broadcasting Commission.

A Tale of Two Cities (1950), and Mañana were full-length operas. The librettist for the former was again Cedric Cliffe. First produced by Dennis Arundell during the Festival of Britain in 1951, it won a gold medal and was later broadcast in a live performance by BBC Radio 3 on 17 April 1953. After this performance, Benjamin revised the piece into its final version. The opera was successfully produced in this form in San Francisco in April 1960, only days before his death. It was revived by the University of Toronto Faculty of Music Opera Division in March 2023. Mañana was commissioned in 1955 and produced by BBC television on 1 February 1956. Unfortunately, it was judged a flop at the time and never revived, although it can currently be viewed on BBC iPlayer (until 3 March 2026).

A fifth opera, Tartuffe, with a libretto by Cedric Cliffe based on Molière, was unfinished at Benjamin's death. The scoring was completed by the composer Alan Boustead and the work produced by the New Opera Company at Sadler's Wells on 30 November 1964, conducted by Boustead. This appears to have been this opera's only performance.

=== Films ===
Benjamin was equally active as a writer of music for films, beginning in 1934 with The Scarlet Pimpernel, an adaptation of music from the Napoleonic era, and Alfred Hitchcock's The Man Who Knew Too Much (1934, remade 1956), for which Benjamin composed the Storm Clouds Cantata. Other scores included those for Alexander Korda's 1947 film of An Ideal Husband, The Conquest of Everest, The Cumberland Story (1947), Steps of the Ballet (British Council/Central Office of Information 1948), Master of Bankdam (Holbein Films 1947), Above Us the Waves (1955) and Fire Down Below (1957). While most of his music scores are archived in the British Library, his film scores are completely lost. Apart from the Boosey & Hawkes edition of An Ideal Husband the only surviving score is the Storm Clouds Cantata.
